= 40s BC =

Decade

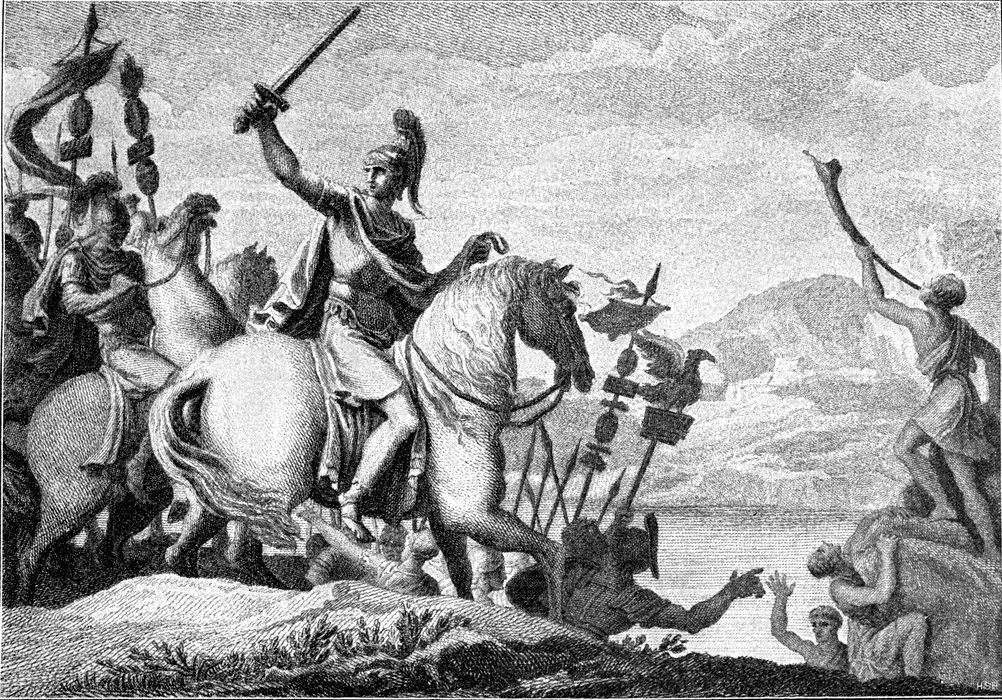
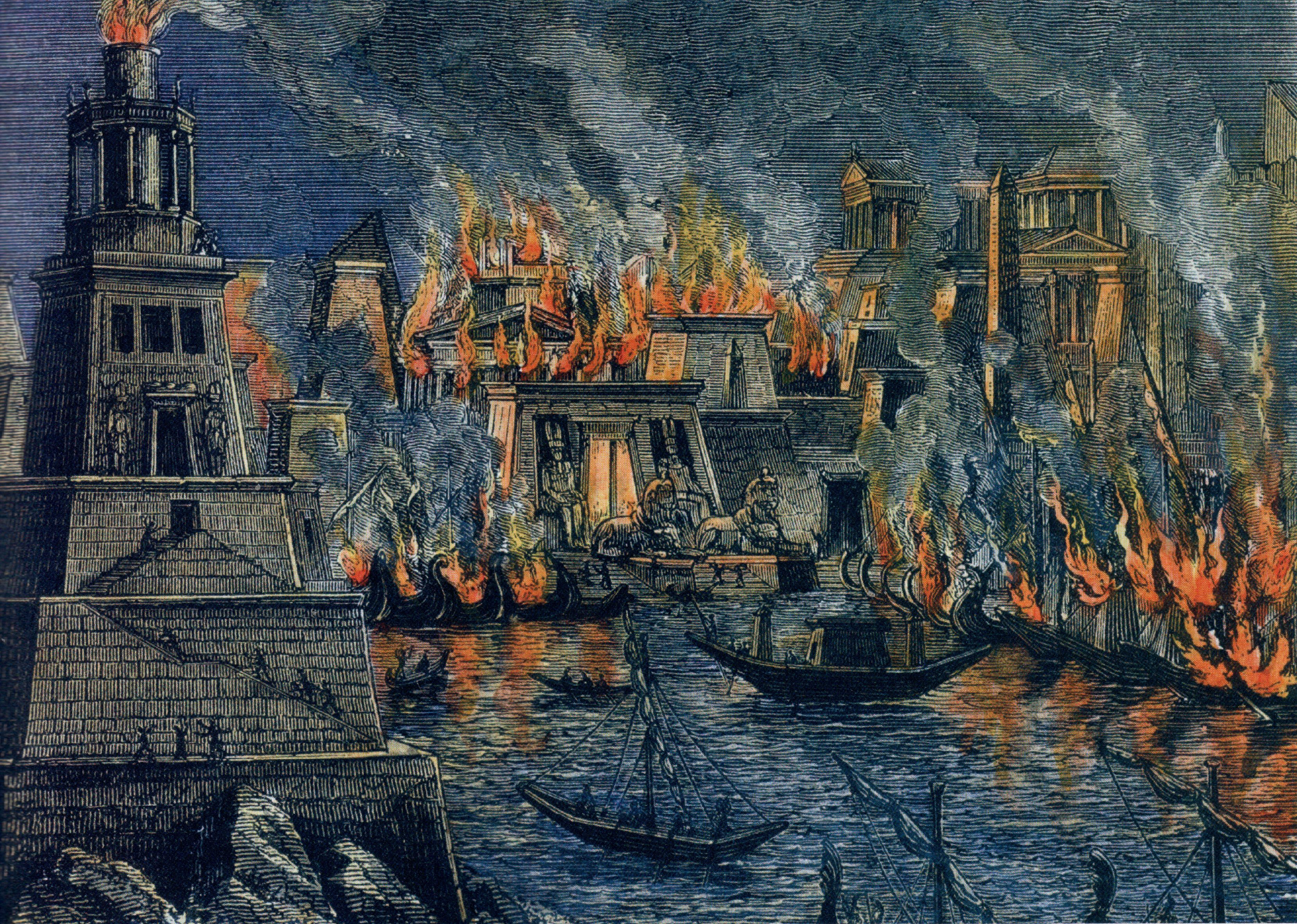
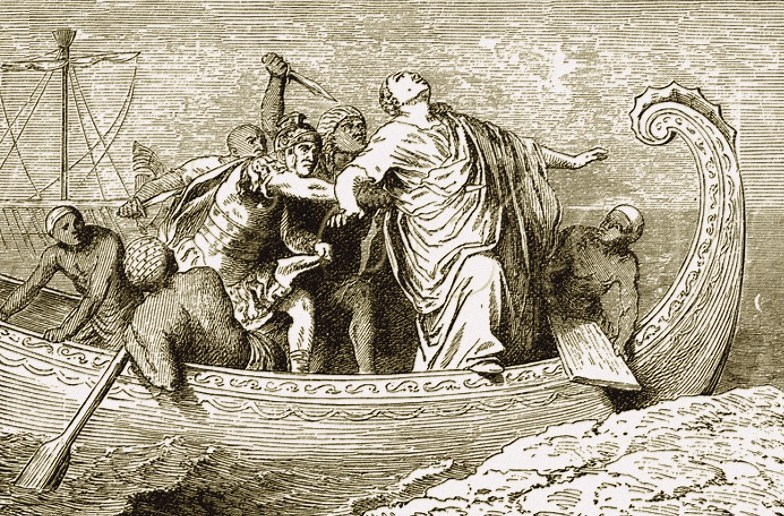
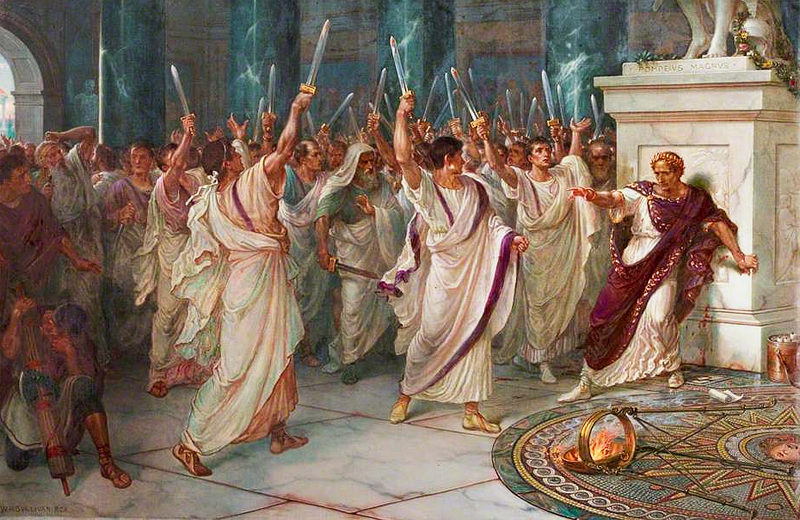
From left, clockwise: Julius Caesar crossing the Rubicon; Fire of Alexandria following a Roman siege; Assassination of Pompey the Great; Assassination of Julius Caesar.

The 40s BC were the period 49 BC – 40 BC.

== Events ==
=== By place and Date ===
==== Roman Republic ====
- Consuls: Lucius Cornelius Lentulus Crus, Gaius Claudius Marcellus.
- Caesar's Civil War commences:
  - January 1 – The Roman Senate receives a proposal from Julius Caesar that he and Pompey should lay down their commands simultaneously. The Senate responds that Caesar must immediately surrender his command.
  - January – Caesar leads his army across the Rubicon, which separates his jurisdiction in Cisalpine Gaul from that of the Senate in Rome, and thus initiates a civil war.
  - February – Pompey's flight to Epirus (in Western Greece) with most of the Senate.
  - March 9 – Caesar advances against Pompeian forces in Spain.
  - April 19 – Siege of Massilia: Caesar commences a siege at Massilia against the Pompeian Lucius Domitius Ahenobarbus. He leaves the newly raised legions XVII, XVIII and XIX to conduct the siege. Decimus Brutus – victor over the Veneti (see 56 BC) – is in charge of the fleet to blockade the harbor.
  - June – Caesar arrives in Spain; seizes the Pyrenees passes against the Pompeians L. Afranius and Marcus Petreius.
  - June 7 – Cicero slips out of Italy and goes to Thessaloniki.
  - July 30 – Caesar surrounds Afranius and Petreius's army in Ilerda.
  - August 2 – Pompeians in Ilerda surrender to Caesar and are granted pardon.
  - August 24 – Caesar's general Gaius Scribonius Curio is defeated in North Africa by the Pompeians under Attius Varus and King Juba I of Numidia (whom he defeated earlier in the Battle of Utica) in the Battle of the Bagradas, after which he commits suicide.
  - September – Brutus defeats the combined Pompeian-Massilian naval forces of the siege of Massilia, while the Caesarian fleet in the Adriatic Sea is defeated near Curicta (Krk).
  - September 6 – Massilia surrenders to Caesar, as he is coming back from Spain.
  - October – Caesar is appointed Dictator in Rome.

== 48 BC ==
=== By place ===
==== Roman Republic ====
- Consuls: Gaius Julius Caesar and Publius Servilius Vatia Isauricus. Caesar is named consul for a period of five years.
- Caesar's Civil War:
  - January 4 – Julius Caesar lands at Dyrrhachium (Durazzo).
  - March – Mark Antony joins Julius Caesar.
  - April – Siege of Dyrrhachium: Julius Caesar builds a fortified line of entrenchments and besieges Pompey the Great.
  - The Roman temple to Bellona on the Capitolinus outside Rome is burnt to the ground.
  - May – Publius Servilius Vatia Isauricus, co-consul with Julius Caesar, destroys Caelius's magistrate's chair on his tribunal.
  - July 10 – Battle of Dyrrhachium: Julius Caesar barely avoids a catastrophic defeat to Pompey in Macedonia; he retreats to Thessaly.
  - August – Battle of Pharsalus: Julius Caesar decisively defeats Pompey at Pharsalus, who flees to Egypt. Pompey's army by and large is pardoned.
  - Winter – Siege of Oricum: Julius Caesar captures the strategic city port of Oricum in Epirus (modern Albania). The garrison opens the town's gate and Lucius Manlius Torquatus surrenders to Caesar.
  - December – Battle of Nicopolis: King Pharnaces II of Pontus defeats the Roman forces under Gnaeus Domitius Calvinus, a loyal partisan of Julius Caesar.

==== Egypt ====
- September 28 – Pompey the Great is assassinated on the orders of King Ptolemy XIII, after landing in Egypt (may have occurred September 29, records unclear).
- October – Julius Caesar reaches Alexandria, a city founded by Alexander the Great. He is met by an Egyptian delegation from Ptolemy XIII. The Egyptians offer him gifts: the ring of Pompey and his head.
- Queen Cleopatra VII returns to the palace rolled into a Persian carpet and has it presented to Caesar by her servant. The Egyptian princess, only twenty-one years old, becomes his mistress.
- December – Battle in Alexandria: Forces of Caesar and his ally Cleopatra VII and those of rival King Ptolemy XIII and Queen Arsinoe IV. The latter two are defeated and flee the city, but during the battle part of the Library of Alexandria catches fire.

==== Asia ====
- Yuan becomes emperor of the Han Dynasty (until 33 BC).

== 47 BC ==
=== By place ===
==== Roman Republic ====
- Consuls: Quintus Fufius Calenus, Publius Vatinius.
- Julius Caesar returns to Rome and is dictator for a year.
- Civil War:
  - August – Julius Caesar leads victory against Pharnaces II of Pontus and at the Battle of Zela.
  - August – Julius Caesar quells a mutiny of his veterans in Rome.
  - October – Caesar's invasion of Africa, against Metellus Scipio and Labienus, Caesar's former lieutenant in Gaul.

==== Egypt ====
- January 13 – Queen Cleopatra VII promotes her younger brother Ptolemy XIV of Egypt to co-ruler.
- February – Caesar and his ally Cleopatra VII of Egypt defeat the forces of the rival Egyptian Queen Arsinoe IV in the Battle of the Nile. Ptolemy is killed; Caesar, with the aid of Mithridates I of the Bosporus, then relieves his besieged forces in Alexandria.

==== Anatolia ====
- August 2 – Caesar defeats Pharnaces II of Pontus, king of the Bosphorus, in the Battle of Zela (the war Caesar tersely describes as veni, vidi, vici).

==== Judea ====
- Battle at Mount Tabor in Judea: Roman troops, commanded by Gabinius, defeat the forces of Alexander, son of Aristobulus II of Judea, who is attempting to re-establish Judean independence. Some 10,000 Jews die at the hands of the Romans.

==== China ====
- Feng Yuan becomes consort to Emperor Yuan of the Han Dynasty.

== 46 BC ==
=== By place ===
==== Roman Republic ====
- Consuls: Gaius Julius Caesar, Marcus Aemilius Lepidus.
- Julius Caesar establishes Julia Paterna Arelate as a colony in Gaul for veterans of the Sixth Legion, at the present day site of Arles.
- Civil War:
  - January 4 – Titus Labienus fights Julius Caesar in the Battle of Ruspina.
  - April – Caesar defeats Pompey loyalists at Thapsus.
  - April 6 – Caesar defeats the combined army of Pompeian followers and Numidians under Metellus Scipio and Juba I of Numidia at Thapsus. After the battle Caesar grants Legio V Alaudae the right to bear the elephant symbol on its shields and standards, for bravery against a charge of elephants.
  - April 20 – Cicero, in Rome, writes to Varro "If our voices are no longer heard in the Senate and in the Forum, let us follow the example of the ancient sages and serve our country through our writings, concentrating on questions of ethics and constitutional law."
  - Caesar's erstwhile mistress, Queen Cleopatra VII of Egypt, and his son by her, Caesarion, take up residence in one of the dictator's estates on the Tiber.
  - September 26 – Julius Caesar dedicates a temple to his mythical ancestor Venus Genetrix in fulfillment of a vow he made at the battle of Pharsalus.
  - November – Caesar leaves for Hispania to deal with a fresh outbreak of resistance.
  - Caesar reforms the Roman calendar to create the Julian calendar. The transitional year is extended to 445 days to synchronize the new calendar and the seasonal cycle. The Julian Calendar would remain the standard in the western world for over 1600 years, until superseded by the Gregorian Calendar in 1582.
  - Caesar appoints his nephew Octavian his heir.
  - Caesar subdues a mutiny of his Tenth Legion.
  - Caesar celebrates his Gallic Triumph, after which Vercingetorix is executed. The celebrations run for forty days in Rome, and include public banquets, plays and gladiatorial games.

== 45 BC ==
=== By place ===
==== Roman Republic ====
- Fourth consulship of Gaius Julius Caesar (without colleague).
- January 1 – The Julian calendar takes effect as the civil calendar of the Roman Empire, establishing a solar calendar that is based on the Egyptian calendar of the day.
- March 17 – Civil War: In his last victory, Julius Caesar defeats the Pompeian forces of Titus Labienus and Pompey the younger in the Battle of Munda. Labienus dies in battle, Pompey the younger is executed, but Sextus Pompey escapes to take command of the remnants of the Pompeian fleet.
- The veterans of Julius Caesar's Legions Legio XIII Gemina and Legio X Equestris demobilize. The veterans of the 10th legion are settled in Narbo, while those of the 13th are given somewhat better lands in Italia itself.
- End of the Roman Civil War.
- Caesar is named dictator for life.
- Caesar probably writes his Commentaries in this year.

==== Asia ====
- Possible first year of the Azes I Era.

== 44 BC ==
=== By place ===
==== Roman Republic ====
- Consuls: Gaius Julius Caesar and Mark Antony.
- February – Rome celebrates the festival of the Lupercal. Mark Antony twice presents Caesar with a royal diadem, urging him to take it and declare himself king. He refuses this offer and orders the crown to be placed in the Temple of Jupiter.
- March 15 (the Ides of March) – Julius Caesar, dictator of Rome, is assassinated by a group of senators, amongst them Gaius Cassius Longinus, Marcus Junius Brutus, and Caesar's Massilian naval commander, Decimus Brutus.
- March 20 – Caesar's funeral is held. Marcus Antony gives a eulogy and in his speech he makes accusations of murder and ensures a permanent breach with the conspirators against Caesar. He snatches Caesar's bloody tunic and purple toga to show the crowd the stab wounds; the citizens tear apart the forum and cremate their Caesar on a makeshift pyre. Antony becomes the highest ranking politician in Rome.
- April – Octavian returns from Apollonia in Dalmatia to Rome to take up Caesar's inheritance, against advice from Atia (his mother and Caesar's niece) and consul Antony.
- April 18–April 21 – Octavian engages in a charm offensive with consular Cicero who is fulminating against Mark Antony.
- June – Antony is granted a five-year governorship of northern and central Transalpine Gaul (France) and Cisalpine Gaul (Northern Italy).
- September 2
  - Pharaoh Cleopatra VII of Egypt declares her son co-ruler as Ptolemy XV Caesarion.
  - The first of Cicero's Philippicae (oratorical attacks) on Antony is published. He will make 14 of them over the next several months.
- December – Antony besieges Brutus Albinus in Mutina (Modena), with Octavian, an ally of Decimus, who is one of his uncle's assassins, close by.

==== Europe ====
- Comosicus succeeds Burebista as king of Dacia.

== 43 BC ==
=== By place ===
==== Roman Republic ====
- Consuls: Gaius Vibius Pansa Caetronianus and Aulus Hirtius. The Roman Senate confirms Octavian as propraetor with joint responsibility for the campaign against Antony. Hirtius and Octavian mobilize troops for the march to Mutina, while Pansa continues the levy. Embassy dispatched to treat with Antony.
- January 7 – Octavian is given imperium, marking the start of his public career.
- Marcus Junius Brutus proceeds to secure his position in Thrace and Macedonia. Gaius Cassius Longinus campaigns in Syria and defeats the army of Publius Cornelius Dolabella at Laodicea.
- March – Vibius Pansa set out to link up with Hirtius and Octavian, bringing four legions of recruits, having left one, the legio urbana, to defend Rome.
- April 14 – Battle of Forum Gallorum: Mark Antony, besieging Caesar's assassin Decimus Brutus Albinus in Mutina, defeats the forces of the consul Pansa, but is then immediately defeated by the army of the other consul, Hirtius. Both consuls are killed (Hirtius does not die until after the Battle of Mutina).
- April 16 – Octavian is first proclaimed imperator by his troops.
- April 21
  - Cicero's 14th and last Philippic.
  - Antony is again defeated in the Battle of Mutina by a coalition of Octavian, Decimus Brutus, and the two consuls of the year.
- Antony marches to Parma (which is sacked) and Placentia. He then crosses the Ligurian Alps to Vada Sabatia, 50 km (31 mi) south-west of Genoa, and joins with Aemilius Lepidus, soon after Decimus Brutus is killed by brigands. The Senate declares Antony a hostis, an enemy of the state. Sextus Pompey becomes supreme commander of the Roman navy and Gaius Cassius proconsul of Syria.
- Summer – Gaius Cassius captures Rhodes after they refuse to pay tribute. Their fleet is defeated by Roman galleys in the Aegean Sea. He lands a military force on the island and plunders the city. Cassius puts to death 50 of the leading citizens and seizes all the gold he can lay hands on.
- July–August – Antony is again at the head of a large army; Octavian enters Rome in force without opposition. It is clear that Cicero's plan to divide them against each other has failed.
- August 19 – Octavian takes office as consul. He's prevailed to pass the lex Pedia, a law establishing the murder of Caesar as a capital crime.
- November 26 – Octavian meets Antony and Lepidus in Bononia and the three enter into an official five-year autocratic pact, the Second Triumvirate (see lex Titia). To cement their reconciliation Octavian agrees to marry Claudia, a daughter of Antony's wife Fulvia by her former husband Publius Clodius Pulcher.
- November – The triumvirs introduce proscriptions in which allegedly 130 senators and 2,000 equites are branded as outlaws and deprived of their property.
- December 7 – The orator Cicero is killed in Formiae in a litter going to the seaside, by a party led by Herennius (a centurion) and Popilius (a military tribune). His head and hands are displayed on the Rostra in the Forum Romanum.

==== Gaul ====
- Lugdunum (modern-day Lyon) is founded.
- First reference to Cularo (Grenoble).

==== Asia ====
- According to legend, Nagasena creates the Emerald Buddha figurine in Patna, India.

==== North America ====
- Mount Okmok volcano in the Aleutian Islands erupts with a volcanic explosivity index of 6, with climatic effects extending as far as Egypt.

== 42 BC ==
=== By place ===
==== Roman Republic ====
- January – Publius Vatinius, governor of Illyricum, seizes Dyrrachium and is forced to surrender his army (three legions) to Marcus Junius Brutus.
- Marcus Brutus begins to plunder the cities of Asia Minor, in order to obtain money and soldiers. The inhabitants of Lycia refuse to submit to Rome, and Brutus besieges Xanthus. After destroying their suburbs, the Xanthians withdraw into the heavily fortified city. The Roman legionaries (2,000 men) force the gate and fight their way into the forum. The citizens make a last stand by the temple of Sarpedon and, as night falls, the Roman army conquers the city.
- The confederation of Lycia sends ambassadors to Brutus, promising to form a military league and contribute money for building ships. Gaius Cassius Longinus occupies Rhodes, and orders all the other cities of Asia to pay a tribute for 10 years.
- July – Mark Antony lands with an army (28 legions) in Illyria, leaving Octavian ill at Dyrrachium, and marches to Amphipolis. Admiral Ahenobarbus, with the Republican fleet (130 warships), blockades the Adriatic Sea.
- August – Lucius Decidius Saxa and Gaius Norbanus Flaccus are appointed by Mark Antony, to lead an advanced force of eight legions to Macedonia along the Via Egnatia into Thrace.
- September – Brutus and Cassius cross the Hellespont. They march to Doriscus but further progress is blocked by Saxa's occupation of the Corpili Pass.
- Saxa retreats to link up with Norbanus at the Sapaei Pass. The Republicans outflank the enemy, forging an alternate route through the mountains in the north.
- Brutus and Cassius advance to Philippi and build fortifications. Antony links up with Norbanus and Saxa at Amphipolis, Octavian arrives on a litter 10 days later.
- In Sicily, Sextus Pompeius leads the naval operations in the Mediterranean Sea against the triumvirs. He blockades the grain routes from Spain and Africa.
- October 3 – First Battle of Philippi: The Triumvirs Mark Antony and Octavian fight an indecisive battle with Caesar's assassins Marcus Brutus and Cassius. The Roman forces including 2,000 Spartans, who have just arrived, are routed. Octavian takes refuge in the marsh. Cassius' camp is captured by Antony's men and, wrongly fearing that Brutus is dead, Cassius commits suicide. He orders his freedman Pindarus to kill him. Brutus, fearing the impact on morale, secretly buries his beheaded body on Thasos. The Republican navy, in the Adriatic, intercept and destroy the supply ships with two legions of the Triumvirs.
- October 23 – Second Battle of Philippi: Brutus' army is defeated by Antony and Octavian. The Triumvirs smash through the weakened Republican centre and take Brutus's right wing in their flank. After the battle, 14,000 legionaries lay down their arms. Brutus flees to the heights of Philippi, where he commits suicide the following day. After the victory, Brutus' body is brought to Antonius' camp, where he casts his purple paludamentum over his dead body and orders an honourable funeral for his erstwhile comrade. The Republican cause is crushed, and Rome rests in the hands of the Second Triumvirate.
- Octavian returns to Rome and arranges for ± 40,000 veterans' settlements in Campania, Etruria, Picenum, Samnium, Umbria, and in northern Italy.

== 41 BC ==
=== By place ===
==== Roman Republic ====
- Consuls: Lucius Antonius and Publius Servilius Vatia Isauricus.
- Perusine War: An armed resistance breaks out across Italy; the Umbrian city of Sentinum is captured and destroyed by Quintus Salvidienus Rufus.
- Lucius Antonius occupies Perusia. He accepts the appeal of the local population. Lucius and Fulvia are defeated by Gaius Julius Caesar Octavian in the Battle of Perugia.

==== Egypt ====
- Mark Antony meets Cleopatra VII in Tarsus (Cilicia) and forms an alliance. He returns to Alexandria with her and they become lovers in the winter of 41–40 BC. To safeguard herself and Caesarion, she has Antony order the execution of her (half) sister Arsinoe IV, who is living at the temple of Artemis in Ephesus.

== 40 BC ==
=== By place ===
==== Roman Republic ====
- Consuls: Gnaeus Domitius Calvinus and Gaius Asinius Pollio.
- Siege of Perusia: trying a last attempt to break the siege, which fails; Lucius Antonius surrenders to Octavian. His life is spared, but the citizens are executed or sold into slavery. Fulvia flees with her children and is exiled to Sicyon, where she dies of a sudden illness.
- Spring – Quintus Salvidienus Rufus marches to Transalpine Gaul to take command of the eleven legions, after the death of Quintus Fufius Calenus. Octavian divorces Claudia and marries Scribonia, a sister of Lucius Scribonius Libo and a follower of Sextus.
- May – Gaius Claudius Marcellus, a distinguished member of the Claudii, dies. He leaves Octavia the Younger (the elder sister of Octavian) widowed. She will later marry Mark Antony.
- Sextus Pompey dispatches Menas with four legions and captures Sardinia, driving out Octavian's governor Marcus Lurius. He seizes the capital, Caralis and occupies Corsica. Sextus besieges Cosenza in Bruttium and Thurii in Lucania, ravaging the territory with his cavalry.
- Sextus' fleet raids the ports of Puteoli and Ostia. The populace hold the Triumvirs responsible for prolonging the war, provoking a riot on the Forum. Octavian, with the Praetorian Guard, goes to intercept the riot, and only escapes with his life because Antony summons troops to rescue his junior colleague.
- Treaty of Brundisium: The Triumvirs agrees to divide the Roman Republic into spheres of influence. Gaius Octavian styles himself "Imperator Caesar" and takes control of the Western provinces. Mark Antony is given the Eastern provinces; the River Drin, the boundary between the provinces Illyricum and Macedonia, is to serve as their frontier. Marcus Aemilius Lepidus controls Hispania and Africa. The treaty is cemented by the marriage of Antony and Octavia the Younger.

=== Asia minor ===
- Quintus Labienus occupies Cilicia and marches, with an army, into Anatolia. Most cities surrender without resistance, except for Alabanda and Mylasa. The Parthians restore their territory to nearly the limits of the old Achaemenid Empire. Labienus proclaims himself "Parthian Emperor" of Asia Minor.

==== Egypt ====
- Mark Antony leaves Alexandria. After receiving news of the outcome at Perusia while en route to Phoenicia, he sets sail for Italy meeting the ambassadors of Sextus Pompey in Athens.

==== Igodomigodo Kingdom ====
- Ogiso Igodo dissolves the Ik’edionwere Council (western Africa). establishes the Royal Council with members of the disbanded Ik’edionwere Council and the Odibo-Ogiso group. He names his combined territories, Igodomigodo with its capital at Ugbekun.

==== Greece ====
- Athenodorus, a philosopher, encounters a ghost in Athens. This popular story is one of the first poltergeist stories in history.

==== Parthia ====
- Pacorus crosses, with the help of Quintus Labienus, the Euphrates and invades Syria. The capital Antioch surrenders, and the Parthians take Phoenicia and Judea. However, they cannot besiege the fortified city of Tyre, because they have no fleet.
- Parthians conquer Jerusalem. Hyrcanus II is removed from power, while Antigonus the Hasmonean becomes king of Judea under Parthian rule. Herod the Great flees Jerusalem to Rome. There he is titled king of Judea by Mark Antony.

==== China ====
- The Ji Jiu Pian dictionary, published about this year during the Han dynasty, is the earliest known reference to the hydraulic-powered trip hammer device.

== Significant people ==
- Julius Caesar, Roman dictator (lived 100–44 BC, term 46–44 BC)
- Marcus Junius Brutus, Roman politician (85–42 BC)
- Mark Antony, Roman politician and general (83–30 BC)
- Pharaoh Cleopatra VII of Egypt (lived 70/69–30 BC, reigned 51–30 BC)—enters her twenties, has son Caesarion with Julius Caesar, before meeting Mark Antony
- Gaius Iulius Caesar Octavianus, Roman politician and general (62 BC–AD 14)
- Pharaoh Ptolemy XV Caesarion (lived 47–30 BC, reigned 44–30 BC)
- Gaius Cassius Longinus, Roman politician (died 42 BC)

== Births ==
49 BC

- Lucius Domitius Ahenobarbus, Roman consul (d. 25 AD)

48 BC

- Lady Ban, Chinese concubine and female poet
- Lucius Calpurnius Piso, Roman consul (d. AD 32)
- Publius Cornelius Scipio, Roman consul and governor

47 BC

- June 23 – Caesarion, prince of Egypt, later Ptolemy XV (d. 30 BC)
- Marcus Antonius Antyllus, son of Mark Antony and Fulvia (d. 30 BC)

46 BC

- Imhotep-Pedubast, High priest of Ptah (d. 30 BC)
- Antipater, son of Herod the Great (d. 4 BC)
- Lucius Seius Strabo, Roman prefect of the Praetorian Guard (d. 16 AD)
- Publius Quinctilius Varus, Roman politician and general (d. 9 AD)

45 BC

- Iullus Antonius, son of Mark Antony and Fulvia; consul 10 BC (d. 2 BC)
- Wang Mang, usurper of the Han dynasty and emperor of the Xin dynasty (d. AD 23)

44 BC

- Gnaeus Calpurnius Piso, Roman statesman, consul and governor (d. 20 AD)

43 BC

- March 20 – Ovid, Roman poet (d. AD 17/18)
- Iotapa, princess of Media Atropatene (daughter of Artavasdes I)
- Iullus Antonius, Roman consul (son of Mark Antony) (suicide 2 BC)

42 BC

- November 16 – Tiberius, Roman emperor (d. 37 AD)
- Marcus Claudius Marcellus, nephew of Augustus (d. 23 BC)

41 BC

- Gaius Asinius Gallus Saloninus, Roman consul under Caesar Augustus (d. AD 33)

40 BC

- Ariobarzanes II, Roman client king of Armenia (d. 4 AD)
- Cleopatra Selene (d. AD 6) and Alexander Helios (d. between 29 and 25 BC), twins of Cleopatra VII and Mark Antony

== Deaths ==
49 BC

- January 10 – Xuan of Han, emperor of the Han dynasty (b. 91 BC)
- Aristobulus II, king and high priest of Judea
- Gaius Memmius, Roman orator and poet (presumed).
- Gaius Scribonius Curio, Roman politician
- Jieyou, princess of the Han dynasty (b. 121 BC)
- Marcus Perperna, Roman politician
- Zheng Ji, general of the Han dynasty

48 BC

- September 28 – Pompey (the Great), Roman politician (b. 106 BC)
- Afriana Carfania, Roman orator
- Cotys I, Thracian client king of the Odrysian Kingdom
- Gnaeus Cornelius Lentulus Marcellinus, Roman statesman
- Lucius Cornelius Lentulus Crus, Roman politician
- Marcus Calpurnius Bibulus, Roman politician
- Titus Annius Milo, Roman politician
- Marcus Caelius Rufus, Roman orator and politician
- Zhang Chang, Chinese scholar and official

47 BC

- Pharnaces II of Pontus, king of the Bosporan Kingdom (b. c. 97 BC)
- Ptolemy XIII Theos Philopator, king of Egypt (drowned in the Nile)
- Alexander, Hasmonean prince (executed)

46 BC

- April 12 - Marcus Porcius Cato (the Younger), Roman politician (b. 95 BC) (commits suicide)
- Faustus Cornelius Sulla, Roman politician and quaestor
- Juba I, king of Numidia (killed after the Battle of Thapsus)
- Saburra, General of Juba I (killed in battle by Publius Sittius)
- Lucius Afranius, Roman consul and governor (b. 112 BC)
- Lucius Manlius Torquatus, Roman politician and general
- Marcus Petreius, Roman politician and general (b. 110 BC) (commits suicide)
- Quintus Caecilius Metellus Scipio, Roman consul and general (commits suicide)
- Vercingetorix, Gaulish king and chieftain of the Arverni tribe (executed at the end of a triumph)

45 BC

- February – Tullia, daughter of Cicero (b. 79 BC or 78 BC)
- March 17
  - Titus Labienus, Roman general (killed in the Battle of Munda) (b. c. 100 BC)
  - Publius Attius Varus, Roman governor (killed in the Battle of Munda)
- April 12 – Gnaeus Pompeius, son of Pompey the Great (executed after the Battle of Munda)
- December 31 – Quintus Fabius Maximus, Roman general and politician
- Nigidius Figulus, Roman scholar (b. 98 BC)
- Publius Cornelius Sulla, Roman politician

44 BC

- March 15 – Julius Caesar, Roman politician and general (assassinated in the Theatre of Pompey) (b. 100 BC)
- c. August – Ptolemy XIV, king (pharaoh) of Egypt (presumed murdered) (b. c. 59 BC)
- Burebista, Thracian king of the Getae and Dacian tribes
- Lucius Caninius Gallus, Roman politician, tribune
- Publius Servilius Vatia Isauricus, Roman consul
- Publius Sittius, Roman mercenary commander

43 BC

- April 22 – Gaius Vibius Pansa, Roman consul and general (killed in battle)
- December 7 – Cicero, Roman statesman and orator (murdered) (b. 106 BC)
- Antipater the Idumaean, Jewish founder of the Herodian dynasty (murdered)
- Atia, niece of Julius Caesar and mother of Augustus (b. 85 BC)
- Aulus Hirtius, Roman consul and historian (killed in battle)
- Decimus Junius Brutus Albinus, Roman statesman (murdered) (b. c. 81 BC)
- Decimus Laberius, Roman nobleman and Latin writer (b. c. 105 BC)
- Gaius Trebonius, Roman politician (assassin of Julius Caesar)
- Gaius Verres, Roman politician and governor (b. c. 120 BC)
- Lucius Calpurnius Piso, Roman consul and governor (b. c. 100 BC)
- Lucius Minucius Basilus, Roman politician (assassin of Julius Caesar, murdered by his own slaves)
- Lucius Roscius Fabatus, Roman politician (killed in battle)
- Pontius Aquila, Roman politician (assassin of Julius Caesar)
- Publius Cornelius Dolabella, suffect consul after the assassination of Julius Caesar (b. 70 BC)
- Publilius Syrus, Syrian comic dramatist and Latin writer
- Quintus Pedius, suffect consul after the assassination of Julius Caesar
- Quintus Tullius Cicero, Roman statesman and general (b. 102 BC)
- Servius Sulpicius Rufus, Roman politician and jurist (b. c. 106 BC)

42 BC

- October 3 – Gaius Cassius Longinus, Roman nobleman (assassin of Julius Caesar) (suicide)
- Marcus Junius Brutus, Roman politician (assassin of Julius Caesar) (b. 85 BC)
- Gaius Antonius, Roman general and brother of Mark Antony (murdered)
- Lucius Tillius Cimber, Roman nobleman (assassin of Julius Caesar)
- Marcus Livius Drusus Claudianus, Roman nobleman and supporter of Brutus (suicide)
- Marcus Porcius Cato, Roman nobleman and son of Cato the Younger (killed in battle)
- Porcia, wife of Brutus (suicide) (approximate date) (b. c. 70 BC)
- Publius Servilius Casca Longus, Roman nobleman (assassin of Julius Caesar)
- Pacuvius Labeo, Roman jurist (assassin of Julius Caesar) (suicide)

41 BC

- Arsinoe IV, Egyptian princess and (half) sister of Cleopatra VII (b. 68 or 67 BC)
- Pasherienptah III, Egyptian High Priest of Ptah (b. 90 BC)
- Serapion, Egyptian general (strategos) and governor

40 BC

- Fulvia, wife of Publius Clodius Pulcher and Mark Antony (b. 77 BC)
- Gaius Claudius Marcellus, Roman consul (b. 88 BC)
- Lucius Decidius Saxa, Roman general and governor
- Phasael, prince of the Herodian dynasty of Judea
- Quintus Fufius Calenus, Roman general and consul
- Quintus Salvidienus Rufus, Roman general and advisor
- Simeon ben Shetach, Pharisee scholar and prince (Nasi)
- Tigellius, Sardinian lyric poet (close friend of Julius Caesar)
