= 50s BC =

Decade

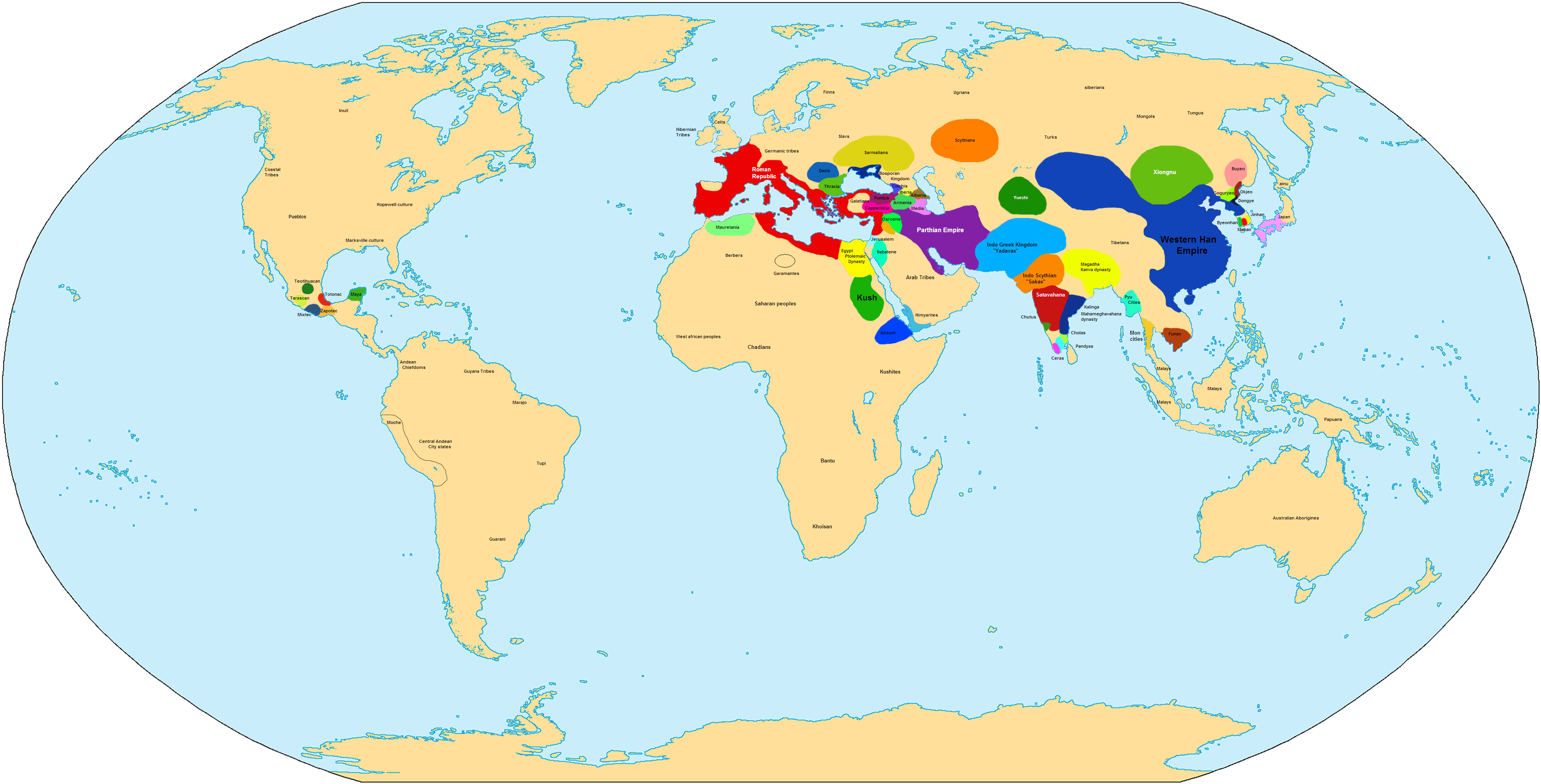
Map of the world in 50 BC.

The 50s BC were the period 59 BC – 50 BC.

== Events ==
=== By place ===
==== Roman Republic ====
- Consuls: Gaius Julius Caesar and Marcus Calpurnius Bibulus (known in jest as "the consulship of Julius and Caesar" due to Bibulus' Social withdrawal from public view to "consult the heavens" in an effort to invalidate Caesar's intended legislation).
- Caesar makes the gazette Acta Diurna (Daily News) public. The Acta contains details of official decrees and appointments; births, deaths, and marriages. Even sport results—the outcome of the gladiatorial contests and chariot races at the capital.
- The First Triumvirate: Caesar, Pompey and Crassus form an unofficial alliance (or 60 BC).
- Caesar marries Calpurnia, in Rome.
- The colonia of Florentia, modern Florence, founded.

== 58 BC ==
=== By place ===
==== Roman Republic ====
- Consuls: Lucius Calpurnius Piso Caesoninus and Aulus Gabinius.
- Publius Clodius Pulcher, Roman tribune, institutes a monthly corn dole for poor Romans, and exiles Cicero from the city.
- Cyprus becomes a Roman province.
- First year of Julius Caesar's Gallic Wars:
  - Julius Caesar becomes a provincial governor (proconsul) and leads a Roman army (6 Roman legions; Legio VII, Legio VIII, Legio IX, Legio X, and newly levied Legio XI and Legio XII) into Gaul. He deploys auxiliaries as part of this army, including Balearic slingers, Numidian and Cretan archers, and Celtic/Gallic cavalry (such as the allied Aedui).
  - Caesar builds a 19-mile earthwork, complete with fortifications and watchtowers, between Lake Geneva and the Jura Mountains.
  - June – Caesar defeats the migrating Helvetii in the Battle of the Arar (Saône).
  - July – Caesar decisively defeats the Helvetii in the Battle of Bibracte.
  - September – Caesar decisively defeats the Suebi led by King Ariovistus in the Battle of Vosges.
  - Winter – Caesar leaves his legions in winter quarters among the Sequani (located in modern-day Burgundy) far to the north of the formal boundary of Gallia Transalpina. He returns to Gallia Cisalpina, carrying out judicial and administrative activities.

==== Egypt ====
- Berenice IV becomes queen of Egypt after temporarily dethroning her father, King Ptolemy XII Auletes.

==== Asia ====
- Base year of the Vikrama Era, founded by Vikrama, king of Ujjain in India.

== 57 BC ==
=== By place ===
==== Roman Republic ====
- Consuls: Publius Cornelius Lentulus Spinther and Quintus Caecilius Metellus Nepos.
- Second year of Julius Caesar's Gallic Wars:
  - Spring – Julius Caesar raises a further two legions (Legio XIII and Legio XIV), bringing his army in Gaul to eight legions (at which strength it remains until 54 BC).
  - Caesar sends Servius Sulpicius Galba with Legio XII into the territory of the Nantuates, Seduni and the Veragri. He occupies Octodurus (modern-day Martigny) in Switzerland.
  - Caesar defeats a Belgic army near Bibrax (modern-day Laon) in the territory of the Remi. He moves northwards against the Belgic tribes, the Nervii and the Aduatuci.
  - May – Battle of the Axona: Caesar defeats the forces of the Belgae under King Galba of the Suessiones.
  - July – Battle of the Sabis: Caesar defeats the Nervii, Roman forces are almost annihilated in an ambush.
  - September – The siege and capture of Aduatuca (modern-day Tongeren) by Caesar.

==== Parthia ====
- Mithridates IV becomes king of Parthia.

==== Asia ====
- King Vikramaditya establishes the Vikram era.
- Bak Hyeokgeose becomes the first ruler of the kingdom of Silla (traditional date).

== 56 BC ==
=== By place ===
==== Roman Republic ====
- Roman Consuls are Gnaeus Cornelius Lentulus Marcellinus and Lucius Marcius Philippus.
- Clodia accuses her former lover Marcus Caelius Rufus of trying to poison her. The trial ends with the defendant acquitted thanks to the Pro Caelio speech of Cicero. There is no more reference to the formerly well-known Clodia.
- Third year of Julius Caesar's Gallic Wars:
  - Battle of Morbihan: Decimus Junius Brutus Albinus, one of Caesar's subordinates, defeats the Veneti of Brittany. The Gauls lose most of their warships to the Romans in a sea battle at modern-day Quiberon Bay. The strongholds on the coast are stormed, and the population is slaughtered or sold into slavery.
  - The three Roman politician-generals of the First Triumvirate — Caesar, Pompey and Crassus — meet at the Luca Conference at the town of Luca (modern Lucca, in Tuscany), near Pisa, where they renewed their fraying political alliance, and further cemented the three men's increasing consolidation of power in the Roman Republic.
  - Autumn – Julius Caesar leads an attack on the Morini and the Menapii tribes of the Belgae on the North Sea. They withdraw into their forests, creating difficulties for Caesar's supply lines. The onset of bad weather forces him to pull back into Gallia Belgica.

==== Britain ====
- This year, or possibly the following year, the king of the Trinovantes called Imanuentius, is overthrown and killed by his rival Cassivellaunus. His son Mandubracius flees to Gaul and appeals to Julius Caesar for help.

== 55 BC ==
=== By place ===
==== Roman Republic ====
- Consuls: Marcus Licinius Crassus and Gnaeus Pompeius Magnus.
- Consuls Marcus Licinius Crassus and Gnaeus Pompeius Magnus pass the Lex Trebonia.
- Pompey's Theater, the first permanent (non-wooden) theatre in Rome is built. Built of stone on the Field of Mars, it included a temple to Venus Victorious, a public courtyard, and a meeting hall or curia in the far end near the "Sacred Area".
- Fourth year of Julius Caesar's Gallic Wars:
  - Spring – Julius Caesar starts the season campaigning in Illyricum (in the Balkan region) against the Pirustae, who have been raiding Roman territory.
  - Summer – Julius Caesar defeats the Usipetes and the Tencteri, two Germanic tribes who have been driven across the Rhine River by the Suebi. He spreads Roman law and order, and makes the whole country as far as the Channel accessible to trade.
  - May – Julius Caesar defeats a Germanic army and massacres the women and children near the Meuse and Rhine Rivers (now known as the city of Kessel in the Netherlands).
  - June – Julius Caesar crosses the Rhine River near modern-day Koblenz. He constructs a wooden bridge between Andernach and Neuwied (Germany).

==== Britain ====
- August 22 or August 26 – Julius Caesar commands his first invasions of Britain, likely a reconnaissance-in-force expedition, in response to the Britons giving military aid to his Gallic enemies. Caesar retreats back to Gaul when the majority of his force is prevented from landing by storms.

==== Parthia ====
- Mithridates IV, claimant to the throne of Parthia, supported by Aulus Gabinius, Roman governor of Syria, is defeated by Surena, general under Orodes, in the Battle of Seleucia.

== 54 BC ==
=== By place ===
==== Roman Republic ====
- Consuls: Appius Claudius Pulcher and Lucius Domitius Ahenobarbus.
- Fifth year of Julius Caesar's Gallic Wars:
  - July – Second of Caesar's Invasions of Britain: Julius Caesar receives nominal submission from the tribal chief Cassivellaunus and installs Mandubracius as a friendly king.
  - Winter – Ambiorix revolts in Gaul. He joins with Catuvolcus in an uprising against the Roman army. Caesar's senior officers Lucius Aurunculeius Cotta and Quintus Titurius Sabinus are ambushed by the Eburones, and killed along with almost their entire forces.
- Pompey builds the first permanent theatre in Rome.
- Crassus arrives in Syria as proconsul and invades the Parthian Empire, initiating the Roman–Persian Wars, which were to last nearly seven centuries.
- Octavia the Younger and Gaius Claudius Marcellus marry.

== 53 BC ==
=== By place ===
==== Parthian Empire ====
- The Parthian Empire achieved a decisive victory against Rome at the Battle of Carrhae, where General Surena defeated and killed Roman triumvir Marcus Licinius Crassus. According to some historical interpretations, the Mahestan (Parthian noble council) supported preparations for the defense of the empire and advised the king during the military mobilization.

==== Roman Republic ====
- Consuls: Marcus Valerius Messalla and Gnaeus Domitius Calvinus.
- Parthian War:
  - Crassus sacks the Temple of Hierapolis and the Temple in Jerusalem on his way to engage the Parthians.
  - May 6 – Battle of Carrhae: Romans defeated, and Crassus killed, by Parthians led by General Surena.
- Gallic War:
  - Julius Caesar suppresses a revolt led by Ambiorix near Sabis (Northern Gaul).
  - At Cenabum (modern Orléans) Roman merchants are massacred by the Carnutes.
  - Vercingetorix, an Arverni chieftain, leads a revolt against Caesar in Central Gaul.
  - Winter – Caesar enrolls non-citizen soldiers in Gallia Transalpina, genesis of Legio V Alaudae. He increases his army to ten legions.

==== Armenia ====
- Artavasdes II becomes king of Armenia.

== 52 BC ==
=== By place ===
==== Roman Republic ====
- Consuls: Quintus Caecilius Metellus Pius Scipio Nasica and Gnaeus Pompeius Magnus.
- Gnaeus Pompeius marries Cornelia Metella.
- Milo is tried for the murder of Clodius. Despite Cicero's legal defence (Pro Milone) he is found guilty and exiled in Massilia (modern Marseille).
- Gallic Wars (Julius Caesar):
  - March – Siege and capture of Avaricum (Bourges).
  - April–May – Siege and repulse from Gergovia.
  - July – Battle of the Vingeanne: Julius Caesar rebuffs, with his German auxiliaries, a Gallic cavalry attack of Vercingetorix.
  - Summer – Siege of Alesia: Julius Caesar spreads out his legions around the Oppidum and builds a string of fortifications surrounding the stronghold of Alesia.
  - September – Battle of Alesia: Julius Caesar defeats the Gallic allies coming to aid Vercingetorix, led by his cousin Vercassivellanus. Vercingetorix surrenders on October 3, signalling the Roman conquest of Gaul. The final pacification of Gaul is completed the following year.
  - Winter – Julius Caesar crosses Mons Cevenna (central Gaul) and sends his army through the passes covered with snowdrifts to take the rebellious Arverni by surprise.

== 51 BC ==
=== By place ===
==== Roman Republic ====
- Consuls: Marcus Claudius Marcellus and Servius Sulpicius Rufus.
- Pompey demands that Julius Caesar lay down his command before he can stand for consul.

==== Egypt ====
- by March 22 – Pharaoh Ptolemy XII Auletes dies and is succeeded by his eldest surviving daughter Cleopatra VII and her younger brother Ptolemy XIII as co-rulers of the Ptolemaic Kingdom. By August 29, official documents start listing Cleopatra as sole ruler.

==== Asia ====
- The Xiongnu split into two hordes. The Eastern horde is subject to China.

== 50 BC ==
=== By place ===
==== Roman Republic ====
- Consuls: Lucius Aemilius Paullus and Gaius Claudius Marcellus.
- The Senate recalls Julius Caesar and rescinds his authority. Caesar breaks alliance with Pompey.
- The Roman artillery piece called Scorpio is invented.
- Initiation Rites of the Cult of Bacchus, detail of a wall painting in the Villa of the Mysteries, Pompeii, is made (approximate date).
- The Roman Republic takes control of Judea (approximate date).

== Significant people ==
- Julius Caesar, Roman politician and general (lived 100–44 BC)
- Pharaoh Cleopatra VII of Egypt (lived 70/69–30 BC, reigned 51–30 BC)—meets Julius Caesar and later becomes teenager Pharaoh, after her brothers die young.
- Pompey, Roman general (lived 106 BC–48 BC)
- Marcus Licinius Crassus, Roman politician and general (lived 115–53 BC)
- Marcus Tullius Cicero, Roman politician (lived 106–43 BC)
- Vercingetorix, Chieftain of the Arverni (d. 46 BC)
- Cassivellaunus, British war-leader
- Ariovistus, German king
- Commius, Gaulish king
- Phraates III, King of Parthia (reigned 70–57 BC)
- Mithridates III, king of Parthia and Media (reigned 57–54 BC)
- Orodes II, king of Parthia (reigned 57–38 BC)
- Surena, Parthian general (lived 84–54 BC)
- Bak Hyeokgeose, king of Silla in Korea (69 BC–AD 4, reigned 57 BC–AD 4)

== Births ==
59 BC

- Artavasdes I, king of Media Atropatene (approximate date)
- Livy, Roman historian and writer (approximate date)
- Ptolemy XIV, king (pharaoh) of Egypt (or 60 BC)
- Livia, Roman empress as the second wife of Augustus

58 BC

- Jumong (King Dongmyeong), king of Goguryeo (d. AD 19)
- Attica, first wife of the Roman general Marcus Vipsanius Agrippa

55 BC

- Tibullus, Roman Latin poet (approximate date)

54 BC

- Gnaeus Cornelius Lentulus, Roman consul (d. AD 25)
- Seneca the Elder, Roman rhetorician and writer
- Tibullus, Roman poet and writer (d. 19 BC)

53 BC

- Aristobulus III, high priest of Jerusalem (d. 36 BC)
- Yang Xiong, Chinese politician and philosopher (d. AD 18)

52 BC

- Fenestella, Roman historian (approximate date)
- Juba II, king of Numidia (d. AD 23)

51 BC

- Cheng, Chinese emperor of the Han dynasty (d. 7 BC)
- Publius Sulpicius Quirinius, Roman aristocrat (d. 21 AD)

50 BC

- Antonia, daughter of Mark Antony
- Gaius Antistius Vetus, Roman consul (d. 1 AD)
- Shammai, Jewish scholar and rabbi (d. 30 AD)

== Deaths ==
59 BC

- Gaius Octavius, father of Caesar Augustus
- He of Changyi, emperor of the Han Dynasty
- Quintus Caecilius Metellus Celer, Roman consul
- Quintus Servilius Caepio, Roman tribune

58 BC

- Go Museo Dangun, 6th ruler of Buyeo (Korea)
- Ptolemy of Cyprus, last Hellenistic king of Cyprus

57 BC

- Boduognatus, leader of the Nervii
- Cleopatra VI, queen of Egypt
- Phraates III, king of Parthia

56 BC

- Lucius Licinius Lucullus, Roman politician (b. 118 BC)
- Philip II Philoromaeus, king of the Seleucid Empire (approximate date)
- Imanuentius, the king of the Trinovantes (a kingdom in Pre-Roman Britain)

55 BC

- Archelaus, high priest of Comana (Cappadocia)
- Berenice IV Epiphaneia, queen of Egypt (b. 77 BC)
- Lucretius, Roman philosopher (b. c. 99 BC)
- Quintus Caecilius Metellus Nepos, Roman consul
- Quintus Caecilius Metellus Nepos Iunior, Roman consul
- Tigranes the Great, Armenian Emperor (b. c. 140 BC)

54 BC

- July 31 – Aurelia Cotta, mother of Julius Caesar (b. 120 BC)
- Ariovistus, leader of the Suebi (approximated date)
- Gaius Valerius Catullus, Roman poet and writer (b. 84 BC)
- Huo Chengjun, empress of the Han Dynasty
- Julia, daughter of Julius Caesar (dies in childbirth)
- Lucius Aurunculeius Cotta, Roman legate of Julius Caesar
- Lucius Gellius Publicola, Roman politician (approximate date)
- Lucius Valerius Flaccus, Roman tribune and praetor
- Mithridates III, king of Parthia (executed by Orodes II)
- Quintus Laberius Durus, Roman tribune of Julius Caesar
- Quintus Titurius Sabinus, Roman legate of Julius Caesar

53 BC

- May 6 (executed after the Battle of Carrhae)
  - Marcus Licinius Crassus, Roman politician and general
  - Publius Licinius Crassus, son of Marcus Licinius Crassus
- Abgar II, Arab king of Edessa (modern Turkey)
- Gaius Scribonius Curio, Roman statesman and orator

52 BC

- January 18 – Publius Clodius Pulcher, murdered on the Appian Way by Titus Annius Milo (b. 93 BC)
- Cyrus, Roman architect (builder for Cicero)
- Sedullos, Gaulish chieftain (b.87 BC)
- Surena, Parthian general (b. 84 BC)

51 BC

- Ariobarzanes II (Philopator), king of Cappadocia
- Julia Minor, sister of Julius Caesar (b. 100 BC)
- Marcus Atius Balbus, Roman praetor and governor (b. 105 BC)
- Posidonius, Greek philosopher, astronomer and geographer
- Ptolemy XII (Auletes), king (pharaoh) of the Ptolemaic Kingdom

50 BC

- Aristobulus II, king of Judea
- Quintus Hortensius, Roman orator and advocate (b. 114 BC)
