= 42 BC =

42 BC in various calendars
- Gregorian calendar: 42 BC; XLII BC
- Ab urbe condita: 712
- Ancient Egypt era: XXXIII dynasty, 282
- Pharaoh: Cleopatra VII, 10
- Ancient Greek Olympiad (summer): 184th Olympiad, year 3
- Assyrian calendar: 4709
- Balinese saka calendar: N/A
- Bengali calendar: −635 – −634
- Berber calendar: 909
- Buddhist calendar: 503
- Burmese calendar: −679
- Byzantine calendar: 5467–5468
- Chinese calendar: 戊寅年 (Earth Tiger); 2656 or 2449 — to — 己卯年 (Earth Rabbit); 2657 or 2450
- Coptic calendar: −325 – −324
- Discordian calendar: 1125
- Ethiopian calendar: −49 – −48
- Hebrew calendar: 3719–3720
- Hindu calendars
- Vikram Samvat: 15–16
- Shaka Samvat: N/A
- Kali Yuga: 3059–3060
- Holocene calendar: 9959
- Iranian calendar: 663 BP – 662 BP
- Islamic calendar: 683 BH – 682 BH
- Javanese calendar: N/A
- Julian calendar: 42 BC; XLII BC
- Korean calendar: 2292
- Minguo calendar: 1953 before ROC 民前1953年
- Nanakshahi calendar: −1509
- Seleucid era: 270/271 AG
- Thai solar calendar: 501–502
- Tibetan calendar: ས་ཕོ་སྟག་ལོ་ (male Earth-Tiger); 85 or −296 or −1068 — to — ས་མོ་ཡོས་ལོ་ (female Earth-Hare); 86 or −295 or −1067

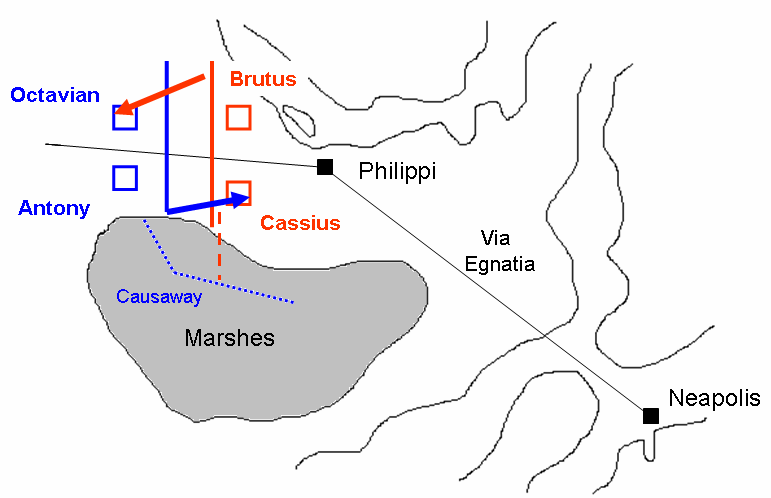
First Battle of Philippi (October 3, 42 BC)

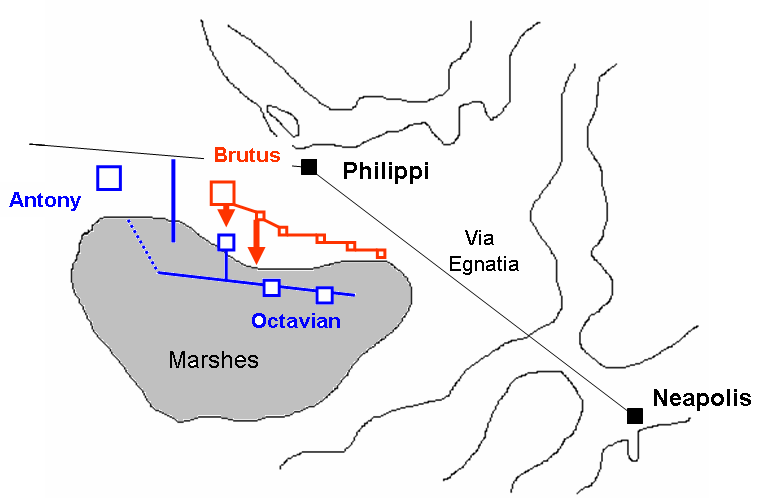
Second Battle of Philippi (October 23, 42 BC)

Year 42 BC was either a common year starting on Monday, Tuesday or Wednesday or a leap year starting on Tuesday of the Julian calendar (the sources differ, see leap year error for further information) and a common year starting on Tuesday of the Proleptic Julian calendar. At the time, it was known as the Year of the Consulship of Lepidus and Plancus (or, less frequently, year 712 Ab urbe condita). The denomination 42 BC for this year has been used since the early medieval period, when the Anno Domini calendar era became the prevalent method in Europe for naming years.

== Events ==
=== By place ===
==== Roman Republic ====
- January – Publius Vatinius, governor of Illyricum, seizes Dyrrachium and is forced to surrender his army (three legions) to Marcus Junius Brutus.
- Marcus Brutus begins to plunder the cities of Asia Minor, in order to obtain money and soldiers. The inhabitants of Lycia refuse to submit to Rome, and Brutus besieges Xanthus. After destroying their suburbs, the Xanthians withdraw into the heavily fortified city. The Roman legionaries (2,000 men) force the gate and fight their way into the forum. The citizens make a last stand by the temple of Sarpedon and, as night falls, the Roman army conquers the city.
- The confederation of Lycia sends ambassadors to Brutus, promising to form a military league and contribute money for building ships. Gaius Cassius Longinus occupies Rhodes, and orders all the other cities of Asia to pay a tribute for 10 years.
- July – Mark Antony lands with an army (28 legions) in Illyria, leaving Octavian ill at Dyrrachium, and marches to Amphipolis. Admiral Ahenobarbus, with the Republican fleet (130 warships), blockades the Adriatic Sea.
- August – Lucius Decidius Saxa and Gaius Norbanus Flaccus are appointed by Mark Antony, to lead an advanced force of eight legions to Macedonia along the Via Egnatia into Thrace.
- September – Brutus and Cassius cross the Hellespont. They march to Doriscus but further progress is blocked by Saxa's occupation of the Corpili Pass.
- Saxa retreats to link up with Norbanus at the Sapaei Pass. The Republicans outflank the enemy, forging an alternate route through the mountains in the north.
- Brutus and Cassius advance to Philippi and build fortifications. Antony links up with Norbanus and Saxa at Amphipolis, Octavian arrives on a litter 10 days later.
- In Sicily, Sextus Pompeius leads the naval operations in the Mediterranean Sea against the triumvirs. He blockades the grain routes from Spain and Africa.
- October 3 – First Battle of Philippi: The Triumvirs Mark Antony and Octavian fight an indecisive battle with Caesar's assassins Marcus Brutus and Cassius. The Roman forces including 2,000 Spartans, who have just arrived, are routed. Octavian takes refuge in the marsh. Cassius' camp is captured by Antony's men and, wrongly fearing that Brutus is dead, Cassius commits suicide. He orders his freedman Pindarus to kill him. Brutus, fearing the impact on morale, secretly buries his beheaded body on Thasos. The Republican navy, in the Adriatic, intercept and destroy the supply ships with two legions of the Triumvirs.
- October 23 – Second Battle of Philippi: Brutus' army is defeated by Antony and Octavian. The Triumvirs smash through the weakened Republican centre and take Brutus's right wing in their flank. After the battle, 14,000 legionaries lay down their arms. Brutus flees to the heights of Philippi, where he commits suicide the following day. After the victory, Brutus' body is brought to Antonius' camp, where he casts his purple paludamentum over his dead body and orders an honourable funeral for his erstwhile comrade. The Republican cause is crushed, and Rome rests in the hands of the Second Triumvirate.
- Octavian returns to Rome and arranges for ± 40,000 veterans' settlements in Campania, Etruria, Picenum, Samnium, Umbria, and in northern Italy.

== Births ==
- November 16 – Tiberius, Roman emperor (d. 37 AD)
- Marcus Claudius Marcellus, nephew of Augustus (d. 23 BC)

== Deaths ==
- October 3 – Gaius Cassius Longinus, Roman nobleman (assassin of Julius Caesar) (suicide)
- Marcus Junius Brutus, Roman politician (assassin of Julius Caesar) (b. 85 BC)
- Gaius Antonius, Roman general and brother of Mark Antony (murdered)
- Lucius Tillius Cimber, Roman nobleman (assassin of Julius Caesar)
- Marcus Livius Drusus Claudianus, Roman nobleman and supporter of Brutus (suicide)
- Marcus Porcius Cato, Roman nobleman and son of Cato the Younger (killed in battle)
- Porcia, wife of Brutus (suicide) (approximate date) (b. c. 70 BC)
- Publius Servilius Casca Longus, Roman nobleman (assassin of Julius Caesar)
- Pacuvius Labeo, Roman jurist (assassin of Julius Caesar) (suicide)
