= 57 BC =

57 BC in various calendars
- Gregorian calendar: 57 BC; LVII BC
- Ab urbe condita: 697
- Ancient Egypt era: XXXIII dynasty, 267
- Pharaoh: Ptolemy XII Auletes, 24
- Ancient Greek Olympiad (summer): 180th Olympiad, year 4
- Assyrian calendar: 4694
- Balinese saka calendar: N/A
- Bengali calendar: −650 – −649
- Berber calendar: 894
- Buddhist calendar: 488
- Burmese calendar: −694
- Byzantine calendar: 5452–5453
- Chinese calendar: 癸亥年 (Water Pig); 2641 or 2434 — to — 甲子年 (Wood Rat); 2642 or 2435
- Coptic calendar: −340 – −339
- Discordian calendar: 1110
- Ethiopian calendar: −64 – −63
- Hebrew calendar: 3704–3705
- Hindu calendars
- Vikram Samvat: 0–1
- Shaka Samvat: N/A
- Kali Yuga: 3044–3045
- Holocene calendar: 9944
- Iranian calendar: 678 BP – 677 BP
- Islamic calendar: 699 BH – 698 BH
- Javanese calendar: N/A
- Julian calendar: N/A
- Korean calendar: 2277
- Minguo calendar: 1968 before ROC 民前1968年
- Nanakshahi calendar: −1524
- Seleucid era: 255/256 AG
- Thai solar calendar: 486–487
- Tibetan calendar: ཆུ་མོ་ཕག་ལོ་ (female Water-Boar); 70 or −311 or −1083 — to — ཤིང་ཕོ་བྱི་བ་ལོ་ (male Wood-Rat); 71 or −310 or −1082

Year 57 BC was a year of the pre-Julian Roman calendar. Contemporaneously, in the Roman Republic, it was known as the Year of the Consulship of Lentulus and Metellus (or, less frequently, year 697 Ab urbe condita). The denomination 57 BC for this year has been used since the early medieval period, when the Anno Domini calendar era became the prevalent method in Europe for naming years.

== Events ==
=== By place ===
==== Roman Republic ====
- Consuls: Publius Cornelius Lentulus Spinther and Quintus Caecilius Metellus Nepos.
- Second year of Julius Caesar's Gallic Wars:
  - Spring – Julius Caesar raises a further two legions (Legio XIII and Legio XIV), bringing his army in Gaul to eight legions (at which strength it remains until 54 BC).
  - Caesar sends Servius Sulpicius Galba with Legio XII into the territory of the Nantuates, Seduni and the Veragri. He occupies Octodurus (modern-day Martigny) in Switzerland.
  - Caesar defeats a Belgic army near Bibrax (modern-day Laon) in the territory of the Remi. He moves northwards against the Belgic tribes, the Nervii and the Aduatuci.
  - May – Battle of the Axona: Caesar defeats the forces of the Belgae under King Galba of the Suessiones.
  - July – Battle of the Sabis: Caesar defeats the Nervii, Roman forces are almost annihilated in an ambush.
  - September – The siege and capture of Aduatuca (modern-day Tongeren) by Caesar.

==== Parthia ====
- Mithridates IV becomes king of Parthia.

==== Asia ====
- King Vikramaditya establishes the Vikram era.
- Bak Hyeokgeose becomes the first ruler of the kingdom of Silla (traditional date).

== Deaths ==
- Boduognatus, leader of the Nervii
- Cleopatra VI, queen of Egypt
- Phraates III, king of Parthia
