= 41 BC =

41 BC in various calendars
- Gregorian calendar: 41 BC; XLI BC
- Ab urbe condita: 713
- Ancient Egypt era: XXXIII dynasty, 283
- Pharaoh: Cleopatra VII, 11
- Ancient Greek Olympiad (summer): 184th Olympiad, year 4
- Assyrian calendar: 4710
- Balinese saka calendar: N/A
- Bengali calendar: −634 – −633
- Berber calendar: 910
- Buddhist calendar: 504
- Burmese calendar: −678
- Byzantine calendar: 5468–5469
- Chinese calendar: 己卯年 (Earth Rabbit); 2657 or 2450 — to — 庚辰年 (Metal Dragon); 2658 or 2451
- Coptic calendar: −324 – −323
- Discordian calendar: 1126
- Ethiopian calendar: −48 – −47
- Hebrew calendar: 3720–3721
- Hindu calendars
- Vikram Samvat: 16–17
- Shaka Samvat: N/A
- Kali Yuga: 3060–3061
- Holocene calendar: 9960
- Iranian calendar: 662 BP – 661 BP
- Islamic calendar: 682 BH – 681 BH
- Javanese calendar: N/A
- Julian calendar: 41 BC; XLI BC
- Korean calendar: 2293
- Minguo calendar: 1952 before ROC 民前1952年
- Nanakshahi calendar: −1508
- Seleucid era: 271/272 AG
- Thai solar calendar: 502–503
- Tibetan calendar: ས་མོ་ཡོས་ལོ་ (female Earth-Hare); 86 or −295 or −1067 — to — ལྕགས་ཕོ་འབྲུག་ལོ་ (male Iron-Dragon); 87 or −294 or −1066

Year 41 BC was either a common year starting on Wednesday or Thursday or a leap year starting on Tuesday, Wednesday or Thursday of the Julian calendar (the sources differ, see leap year error for further information) and a leap year starting on Wednesday of the Proleptic Julian calendar. At the time, it was known as the Year of the Consulship of Antonius and Vatia (or, less frequently, year 713 Ab urbe condita). The denomination 41 BC for this year has been used since the early medieval period, when the Anno Domini calendar era became the prevalent method in Europe for naming years.

== Events ==
=== By place ===
==== Roman Republic ====
- Consuls: Lucius Antonius and Publius Servilius Vatia Isauricus.
- Perusine War: An armed resistance breaks out across Italy; the Umbrian city of Sentinum is captured and destroyed by Quintus Salvidienus Rufus.
- Lucius Antonius occupies Perusia. He accepts the appeal of the local population. Lucius and Fulvia are defeated by Gaius Julius Caesar Octavian in the Battle of Perugia.

==== Egypt ====
- Mark Antony meets Cleopatra VII in Tarsus (Cilicia) and forms an alliance. He returns to Alexandria with her and they become lovers in the winter of 41–40 BC. To safeguard herself and Caesarion, she has Antony order the execution of her (half) sister Arsinoe IV, who is living at the temple of Artemis in Ephesus.

== Births ==
- Gaius Asinius Gallus Saloninus, Roman consul under Caesar Augustus (d. AD 33)

== Deaths ==
- Arsinoe IV, Egyptian princess and (half) sister of Cleopatra VII (b. 68 or 67 BC)
- Pasherienptah III, Egyptian High Priest of Ptah (b. 90 BC)
- Serapion, Egyptian general (strategos) and governor
