= 43 BC =

43 BC in various calendars
- Gregorian calendar: 43 BC; XLIII BC
- Ab urbe condita: 711
- Ancient Egypt era: XXXIII dynasty, 281
- Pharaoh: Cleopatra VII, 9
- Ancient Greek Olympiad (summer): 184th Olympiad, year 2
- Assyrian calendar: 4708
- Balinese saka calendar: N/A
- Bengali calendar: −636 – −635
- Berber calendar: 908
- Buddhist calendar: 502
- Burmese calendar: −680
- Byzantine calendar: 5466–5467
- Chinese calendar: 丁丑年 (Fire Ox); 2655 or 2448 — to — 戊寅年 (Earth Tiger); 2656 or 2449
- Coptic calendar: −326 – −325
- Discordian calendar: 1124
- Ethiopian calendar: −50 – −49
- Hebrew calendar: 3718–3719
- Hindu calendars
- Vikram Samvat: 14–15
- Shaka Samvat: N/A
- Kali Yuga: 3058–3059
- Holocene calendar: 9958
- Iranian calendar: 664 BP – 663 BP
- Islamic calendar: 684 BH – 683 BH
- Javanese calendar: N/A
- Julian calendar: 43 BC; XLIII BC
- Korean calendar: 2291
- Minguo calendar: 1954 before ROC 民前1954年
- Nanakshahi calendar: −1510
- Seleucid era: 269/270 AG
- Thai solar calendar: 500–501
- Tibetan calendar: མེ་མོ་གླང་ལོ་ (female Fire-Ox); 84 or −297 or −1069 — to — ས་ཕོ་སྟག་ལོ་ (male Earth-Tiger); 85 or −296 or −1068

Year 43 BC was either a common year starting on Sunday, Monday or Tuesday or a leap year starting on Sunday or Monday of the Julian calendar (the sources differ, see leap year error for further information) and a common year starting on Monday of the Proleptic Julian calendar. At the time, it was known as the Year of the Consulship of Pansa and Hirtius (or, less frequently, year 711 Ab urbe condita). The denomination 43 BC for this year has been used since the early medieval period, when the Anno Domini calendar era became the prevalent method in Europe for naming years.

== Events ==
=== By place ===
==== Roman Republic ====
- Consuls: Gaius Vibius Pansa Caetronianus and Aulus Hirtius. The Roman Senate confirms Octavian as propraetor with joint responsibility for the campaign against Antony. Hirtius and Octavian mobilize troops for the march to Mutina, while Pansa continues the levy. Embassy dispatched to treat with Antony.
- January 7 – Octavian is given imperium, marking the start of his public career.
- Marcus Junius Brutus proceeds to secure his position in Thrace and Macedonia. Gaius Cassius Longinus campaigns in Syria and defeats the army of Publius Cornelius Dolabella at Laodicea.
- March – Vibius Pansa set out to link up with Hirtius and Octavian, bringing four legions of recruits, having left one, the legio urbana, to defend Rome.
- April 14 – Battle of Forum Gallorum: Mark Antony, besieging Caesar's assassin Decimus Brutus Albinus in Mutina, defeats the forces of the consul Pansa, but is then immediately defeated by the army of the other consul, Hirtius. Both consuls are killed (Hirtius does not die until after the Battle of Mutina).
- April 16 – Octavian is first proclaimed imperator by his troops.
- April 21
  - Cicero's 14th and last Philippic.
  - Antony is again defeated in the Battle of Mutina by a coalition of Octavian, Decimus Brutus, and the two consuls of the year.
- Antony marches to Parma (which is sacked) and Placentia. He then crosses the Ligurian Alps to Vada Sabatia, 50 km (31 mi) south-west of Genoa, and joins with Aemilius Lepidus, soon after Decimus Brutus is killed by brigands. The Senate declares Antony a hostis, an enemy of the state. Sextus Pompey becomes supreme commander of the Roman navy and Gaius Cassius proconsul of Syria.
- Summer – Gaius Cassius captures Rhodes after they refuse to pay tribute. Their fleet is defeated by Roman galleys in the Aegean Sea. He lands a military force on the island and plunders the city. Cassius puts to death 50 of the leading citizens and seizes all the gold he can lay hands on.
- July–August – Antony is again at the head of a large army; Octavian enters Rome in force without opposition. It is clear that Cicero's plan to divide them against each other has failed.
- August 19 – Octavian takes office as consul. He's prevailed to pass the lex Pedia, a law establishing the murder of Caesar as a capital crime.
- November 26 – Octavian meets Antony and Lepidus in Bononia and the three enter into an official five-year autocratic pact, the Second Triumvirate (see lex Titia). To cement their reconciliation Octavian agrees to marry Claudia, a daughter of Antony's wife Fulvia by her former husband Publius Clodius Pulcher.
- November – The triumvirs introduce proscriptions in which allegedly 130 senators and 2,000 equites are branded as outlaws and deprived of their property.
- December 7 – The orator Cicero is killed in Formiae in a litter going to the seaside, by a party led by Herennius (a centurion) and Popilius (a military tribune). His head and hands are displayed on the Rostra in the Forum Romanum.

==== Gaul ====
- Lugdunum (modern-day Lyon) is founded.
- First reference to Cularo (Grenoble).

==== Asia ====
- According to legend, Nagasena creates the Emerald Buddha figurine in Patna, India.

==== North America ====
- Mount Okmok volcano in the Aleutian Islands erupts with a volcanic explosivity index of 6, with climatic effects extending as far as Egypt.

== Births ==
- March 20 – Ovid, Roman poet (d. AD 17/18)
- Iotapa, princess of Media Atropatene (daughter of Artavasdes I)
- Iullus Antonius, Roman consul (son of Mark Antony) (suicide 2 BC)

== Deaths ==
- April 22 – Gaius Vibius Pansa, Roman consul and general (killed in battle)
- December 7 – Cicero, Roman statesman and orator (murdered) (b. 106 BC)
- Antipater the Idumaean, Jewish founder of the Herodian dynasty (murdered)
- Atia, niece of Julius Caesar and mother of Augustus (b. 85 BC)
- Aulus Hirtius, Roman consul and historian (killed in battle)
- Decimus Junius Brutus Albinus, Roman statesman (murdered) (b. c. 81 BC)
- Decimus Laberius, Roman nobleman and Latin writer (b. c. 105 BC)
- Gaius Trebonius, Roman politician (assassin of Julius Caesar)
- Gaius Verres, Roman politician and governor (b. c. 120 BC)
- Lucius Calpurnius Piso, Roman consul and governor (b. c. 100 BC)
- Lucius Minucius Basilus, Roman politician (assassin of Julius Caesar, murdered by his own slaves)
- Lucius Roscius Fabatus, Roman politician (killed in battle)
- Pontius Aquila, Roman politician (assassin of Julius Caesar)
- Publius Cornelius Dolabella, suffect consul after the assassination of Julius Caesar (b. 70 BC)
- Publilius Syrus, Syrian comic dramatist and Latin writer
- Quintus Pedius, suffect consul after the assassination of Julius Caesar
- Quintus Tullius Cicero, Roman statesman and general (b. 102 BC)
- Servius Sulpicius Rufus, Roman politician and jurist (b. c. 106 BC)
