= Pacuvia gens =

Ancient Roman family

The gens Pacuvia was a minor plebeian family at ancient Rome. Members of this gens are first mentioned during the second century BC, and from then down to the first century of the Empire Pacuvii are occasionally encountered in the historians. The first of the Pacuvii to achieve prominence at Rome, and certainly the most illustrious of the family, was the tragic poet Marcus Pacuvius.

== Origin ==
As a nomen, Pacuvius is evidently derived from a common Oscan praenomen, also rendered Pacuvius. The first certain instance of the name as a gentilicium occurs with the tragedian Marcus Pacuvius, a native of Brundisium in Calabria, who was born circa 220 BC, and was active at Rome for many years before his death, circa 130.

== Members ==
- Marcus Pacuvius, the poet, whom Horace regarded as one of the most important of the early tragedians. He wrote in various genres, and was notable not just for translating the works of the Greek playwrights, but for adapting them, as well as creating original plays depicting traditional Roman stories.
- Marcus Pacuvius Claudus, together with his brother, Quintus, joined the accusation of repetundarum (Note: The crime of extorting money from the inhabitants of one's province.) made by Publius Valerius Triarius against Marcus Aemilius Scaurus in 54 BC.
- Quintus Pacuvius Claudus, one of the accusers of Scaurus, together with his brother, Marcus.
- Sextus Pacuvius Taurus, a plebeian aedile mentioned by Pliny the Elder, as having had repaired one of the statues of the Cumaean Sibyl that stood near the Rostra. Probably a different man from the tribune of the plebs under Augustus, who must have lived at a later period.
- Sextus Pacuvius Taurus, tribune of the plebs in 27 BC, was the pre-eminent flatterer of Augustus, and the proposer of the law by which the month of Sextilis was renamed in honour of the emperor. Macrobius relates an anecdote in which the emperor played a joke upon Pacuvius.
- Pacuvius Labeo, a jurist, and one of the assassins of Julius Caesar. Mentioned by Aulus Gellius as the recipient of a letter by Sinnius Capito, cited as an authority in a grammatical dispute. His son was the jurist Antistius Labeo.
- Pacuvius, legate of Gnaeus Sentius Saturninus, the governor of Syria in AD 19. He prevented Domitius Celer, an ally of Gnaeus Calpurnius Piso, from taking charge of the sixth legion at Laodicea. He is probably the same Pacuvius mentioned by the younger Seneca.
- Pacuvius Hister, a legacy-hunter alluded to by Juvenal.
- Sextus Pacuvius Restitutus, a fiscal procurator at Prusa ad Olympum.
- Pacuvia Liciniana, gave an answer to Antoninus Pius, cited by the jurist Ulpian.

== See also ==
- List of Roman gentes

== Bibliography ==
- Lucius Annaeus Seneca (Seneca the Younger), Epistulae Morales ad Lucilium (Moral Letters to Lucilius).
- Quintus Asconius Pedianus, Commentarius in Oratio Ciceronis Pro Scauro (Commentary on Cicero's Oration Pro Scauro).
- Gaius Plinius Secundus (Pliny the Elder), Naturalis Historia (Natural History).
- Publius Cornelius Tacitus, Annales.
- Decimus Junius Juvenalis, Satirae (Satires).
- Aulus Gellius, Noctes Atticae (Attic Nights).
- Cassius Dio, Roman History.
- Macrobius Ambrosius Theodosius, Saturnalia.
- Dictionary of Greek and Roman Biography and Mythology, William Smith, ed., Little, Brown and Company, Boston (1849).
- Paul von Rohden, Elimar Klebs, & Hermann Dessau, Prosopographia Imperii Romani (The Prosopography of the Roman Empire, abbreviated PIR), Berlin (1898).
