= 35 BC =

35 BC in various calendars
- Gregorian calendar: 35 BC; XXXV BC
- Ab urbe condita: 719
- Ancient Egypt era: XXXIII dynasty, 289
- Pharaoh: Cleopatra VII, 17
- Ancient Greek Olympiad (summer): 186th Olympiad, year 2
- Assyrian calendar: 4716
- Balinese saka calendar: N/A
- Bengali calendar: −628 – −627
- Berber calendar: 916
- Buddhist calendar: 510
- Burmese calendar: −672
- Byzantine calendar: 5474–5475
- Chinese calendar: 乙酉年 (Wood Rooster); 2663 or 2456 — to — 丙戌年 (Fire Dog); 2664 or 2457
- Coptic calendar: −318 – −317
- Discordian calendar: 1132
- Ethiopian calendar: −42 – −41
- Hebrew calendar: 3726–3727
- Hindu calendars
- Vikram Samvat: 22–23
- Shaka Samvat: N/A
- Kali Yuga: 3066–3067
- Holocene calendar: 9966
- Iranian calendar: 656 BP – 655 BP
- Islamic calendar: 676 BH – 675 BH
- Javanese calendar: N/A
- Julian calendar: 35 BC; XXXV BC
- Korean calendar: 2299
- Minguo calendar: 1946 before ROC 民前1946年
- Nanakshahi calendar: −1502
- Seleucid era: 277/278 AG
- Thai solar calendar: 508–509
- Tibetan calendar: ཤིང་མོ་བྱ་ལོ་ (female Wood-Bird); 92 or −289 or −1061 — to — མེ་ཕོ་ཁྱི་ལོ་ (male Fire-Dog); 93 or −288 or −1060

Year 35 BC was either a common year starting on Thursday or Friday or a leap year starting on Wednesday, Thursday or Friday of the Julian calendar (the sources differ, see leap year error for further information) and a common year starting on Thursday of the Proleptic Julian calendar. At the time, it was known as the Year of the Consulship of Cornificius and Sextus (or, less frequently, year 719 Ab urbe condita). The denomination 35 BC for this year has been used since the early medieval period, when the Anno Domini calendar era became the prevalent method in Europe for naming years.

== Events ==
=== By place ===
==== Parthian Empire ====
- Phraates IV ascended the Parthian throne after eliminating his father Orodes II and several royal rivals. The Mahestan (the noble council of the Parthian Empire) initially opposed his rise due to concerns about his violent methods. However, Phraates IV consolidated power by executing or exiling many council members, significantly weakening the influence of the Mahestan.

==== Roman Republic ====
- Illyria becomes a Roman province. Gaius Julius Caesar Octavian conducts a rendezvous with the Roman fleet under Agrippa, which is engaged in clearing the Dalmatian coast of piracy.
- Pannonia is attacked by Octavian Caesar, who conquers and sacks the stronghold Siscia (Sisak) of the Segestani, which is taken after a 30-day siege. The country is not definitely subdued, however, until 9 BC.
- Sextus Pompeius defeats the governor of Asia, Gaius Furnius, with three legions and seizes Nicaea and Nicomedia (modern Izmit).
- Marcus Titius arrives in Syria with a large army and marches to Asia Minor. Sextus is caught in Miletus and executed without trial.

==== India ====
- Azes I, Indo-Scythian ruler, completes the domination of the Scythians in northern India.

== Deaths ==
- Aristobulus III, high priest of Judea (drowned) (b. 53 BC)
- Sextus Pompeius, Roman general (executed) (b. 67 BC)
