= 67 BC =

67 BC in various calendars
- Gregorian calendar: 67 BC; LXVII BC
- Ab urbe condita: 687
- Ancient Egypt era: XXXIII dynasty, 257
- Pharaoh: Ptolemy XII Auletes, 14
- Ancient Greek Olympiad (summer): 178th Olympiad, year 2
- Assyrian calendar: 4684
- Balinese saka calendar: N/A
- Bengali calendar: −660 – −659
- Berber calendar: 884
- Buddhist calendar: 478
- Burmese calendar: −704
- Byzantine calendar: 5442–5443
- Chinese calendar: 癸丑年 (Water Ox); 2631 or 2424 — to — 甲寅年 (Wood Tiger); 2632 or 2425
- Coptic calendar: −350 – −349
- Discordian calendar: 1100
- Ethiopian calendar: −74 – −73
- Hebrew calendar: 3694–3695
- Hindu calendars
- Vikram Samvat: −10 – −9
- Shaka Samvat: N/A
- Kali Yuga: 3034–3035
- Holocene calendar: 9934
- Iranian calendar: 688 BP – 687 BP
- Islamic calendar: 709 BH – 708 BH
- Javanese calendar: N/A
- Julian calendar: N/A
- Korean calendar: 2267
- Minguo calendar: 1978 before ROC 民前1978年
- Nanakshahi calendar: −1534
- Seleucid era: 245/246 AG
- Thai solar calendar: 476–477
- Tibetan calendar: ཆུ་མོ་གླང་ལོ་ (female Water-Ox); 60 or −321 or −1093 — to — ཤིང་ཕོ་སྟག་ལོ་ (male Wood-Tiger); 61 or −320 or −1092

Year 67 BC was a year of the pre-Julian Roman calendar. At the time it was known as the Year of the Consulship of Piso and Glabrio (or, less frequently, year 687 Ab urbe condita). The denomination 67 BC for this year has been used since the early medieval period, when the Anno Domini calendar era became the prevalent method in Europe for naming years.

== Events ==
=== By place ===
==== Roman Republic ====
- Consuls: Manius Acilius Glabrio and Gaius Calpurnius Piso.
- During Pompey's war against the pirates, he raises a fleet of 500 warships and fights with great success.
- The lex Gabinia gives Pompey command of the Mediterranean and its coasts for 50 miles inland for three years. He defeats the pirates in three months and pacifies Cilicia.
- Pompey divides the Mediterranean into 13 zones – six in the West and seven in the East – to each of which he assigns a fleet under an admiral.
- Pompey offers the ex-pirates and their families clemency, he settles them in agricultural colonies in eastern Mediterranean lands.
- Pompey takes over the command of Lucius Licinius Lucullus in the war against Mithridates VI of Pontus, and reaps the fruit of the latter's victories.
- Lex Acilia Calpurnia: permanent exclusion from office in cases of electoral corruption.
- Lex Roscia theatralis.
- Julius Caesar reconciles with Pompey and Crassus
- Julius Caesar marries Pompeia, a granddaughter of Sulla

==== Judea ====
- Hyrcanus II becomes king of Judea, for first time (until 66 BC), upon the death of his mother, Salome Alexandra.

==== Pontus ====
- Mithridates VI invades Pontus and defeats a Roman army at the Battle of Zela.
- After his victory at Zela, Mithridates starts consolidating his power in Pontus; restoring his rule over his old kingdom.
- Lucullus returnes to Pontus, but his troops refuse to campaign for him any longer and he withdrew to Galatia.

==== China ====
- December – The army of the Han dynasty Chinese commander Zheng Ji is victorious over the Xiongnu in the Battle of Jushi.

== Births ==
- Arsinoe IV of Egypt, daughter of Ptolemy XII (and probably Cleopatra V) (d. 41 BC)
- Sextus Pompey, Roman general and governor (d. 35 BC)

== Deaths ==
- Lucius Cornelius Sisenna, Roman general and historian (b. c. 120 BC)
- Salome Alexandra, queen of Judea (b. 139 BC)
