= 84 BC =

84 BC in various calendars
- Gregorian calendar: 84 BC; LXXXIV BC
- Ab urbe condita: 670
- Ancient Egypt era: XXXIII dynasty, 240
- Pharaoh: Ptolemy IX Lathyros, 5
- Ancient Greek Olympiad (summer): 174th Olympiad (victor)¹
- Assyrian calendar: 4667
- Balinese saka calendar: N/A
- Bengali calendar: −677 – −676
- Berber calendar: 867
- Buddhist calendar: 461
- Burmese calendar: −721
- Byzantine calendar: 5425–5426
- Chinese calendar: 丙申年 (Fire Monkey); 2614 or 2407 — to — 丁酉年 (Fire Rooster); 2615 or 2408
- Coptic calendar: −367 – −366
- Discordian calendar: 1083
- Ethiopian calendar: −91 – −90
- Hebrew calendar: 3677–3678
- Hindu calendars
- Vikram Samvat: −27 – −26
- Shaka Samvat: N/A
- Kali Yuga: 3017–3018
- Holocene calendar: 9917
- Iranian calendar: 705 BP – 704 BP
- Islamic calendar: 727 BH – 726 BH
- Javanese calendar: N/A
- Julian calendar: N/A
- Korean calendar: 2250
- Minguo calendar: 1995 before ROC 民前1995年
- Nanakshahi calendar: −1551
- Seleucid era: 228/229 AG
- Thai solar calendar: 459–460
- Tibetan calendar: མེ་ཕོ་སྤྲེ་ལོ་ (male Fire-Monkey); 43 or −338 or −1110 — to — མེ་མོ་བྱ་ལོ་ (female Fire-Bird); 44 or −337 or −1109

Year 84 BC was a year of the pre-Julian Roman calendar. At the time it was known as the Year of the Consulship of Carbo and Cinna (or, less frequently, year 670 Ab urbe condita). The denomination 84 BC for this year has been used since the early medieval period, when the Anno Domini calendar era became the prevalent method in Europe for naming years.

== Events ==
=== By place ===
==== Asia ====
- Battle of Cana: The Arab Nabataean Kingdom decisively defeats the Greek Seleucid Empire, slaying King Antiochus XII Dionysus, at modern-day Umm Qais in Jordan.

==== Roman Republic ====
- The First Mithridatic War comes to an end.
- Julius Caesar marries Cornelia

== Births ==
- Catullus, Roman poet (approximate date) (d. c. 54 BC)
- Servilius Casca, Roman politician (d. c. 42 BC)
- Surena, Parthian general (d. 53 BC)

== Deaths ==
- Apellicon of Teos, Greek book collector (approximate date)
- Gaius Flavius Fimbria, Roman politician and general (suicide)
- Lucius Cornelius Cinna, Roman consul (killed by mutinying troops)
- Antiochus XII Dionysus, king of the Seleucid Empire (killed in battle)
