= 59 BC =

59 BC in various calendars
- Gregorian calendar: 59 BC; LIX BC
- Ab urbe condita: 695
- Ancient Egypt era: XXXIII dynasty, 265
- Pharaoh: Ptolemy XII Auletes, 22
- Ancient Greek Olympiad (summer): 180th Olympiad, year 2
- Assyrian calendar: 4692
- Balinese saka calendar: N/A
- Bengali calendar: −652 – −651
- Berber calendar: 892
- Buddhist calendar: 486
- Burmese calendar: −696
- Byzantine calendar: 5450–5451
- Chinese calendar: 辛酉年 (Metal Rooster); 2639 or 2432 — to — 壬戌年 (Water Dog); 2640 or 2433
- Coptic calendar: −342 – −341
- Discordian calendar: 1108
- Ethiopian calendar: −66 – −65
- Hebrew calendar: 3702–3703
- Hindu calendars
- Vikram Samvat: −2 – −1
- Shaka Samvat: N/A
- Kali Yuga: 3042–3043
- Holocene calendar: 9942
- Iranian calendar: 680 BP – 679 BP
- Islamic calendar: 701 BH – 700 BH
- Javanese calendar: N/A
- Julian calendar: N/A
- Korean calendar: 2275
- Minguo calendar: 1970 before ROC 民前1970年
- Nanakshahi calendar: −1526
- Seleucid era: 253/254 AG
- Thai solar calendar: 484–485
- Tibetan calendar: ལྕགས་མོ་བྱ་ལོ་ (female Iron-Bird); 68 or −313 or −1085 — to — ཆུ་ཕོ་ཁྱི་ལོ་ (male Water-Dog); 69 or −312 or −1084

Year 59 BC was a year of the pre-Julian Roman calendar. At the time, it was known as the Year of the Consulship of Caesar and Bibulus (or, less frequently, year 695 Ab urbe condita). The denomination 59 BC for this year has been used since the early medieval period, when the Anno Domini calendar era became the prevalent method in Europe for naming years.

== Events ==
=== By place ===
==== Roman Republic ====
- Consuls: Gaius Julius Caesar and Marcus Calpurnius Bibulus (known in jest as "the consulship of Julius and Caesar" due to Bibulus' Social withdrawal from public view to "consult the heavens" in an effort to invalidate Caesar's intended legislation).
- Caesar makes the gazette Acta Diurna (Daily News) public. The Acta contains details of official decrees and appointments; births, deaths, and marriages. Even sport results—the outcome of the gladiatorial contests and chariot races at the capital.
- The First Triumvirate: Caesar, Pompey and Crassus form an unofficial alliance (or 60 BC).
- Caesar marries Calpurnia, in Rome.
- The colonia of Florentia, modern Florence, founded.

== Births ==
- Artavasdes I, king of Media Atropatene (approximate date)
- Livy, Roman historian and writer (approximate date)
- Ptolemy XIV, king (pharaoh) of Egypt (or 60 BC)
- Livia, Roman empress as the second wife of Augustus

== Deaths ==
- Gaius Octavius, father of Caesar Augustus
- He of Changyi, emperor of the Han dynasty
- Quintus Caecilius Metellus Celer, Roman consul
- Quintus Servilius Caepio, Roman tribune
