= 170 BC =

170 BC in various calendars
- Gregorian calendar: 170 BC; CLXX BC
- Ab urbe condita: 584
- Ancient Egypt era: XXXIII dynasty, 154
- Pharaoh: Ptolemy VI Philometor, 11
- Ancient Greek Olympiad (summer): 152nd Olympiad, year 3
- Assyrian calendar: 4581
- Balinese saka calendar: N/A
- Bengali calendar: −763 – −762
- Berber calendar: 781
- Buddhist calendar: 375
- Burmese calendar: −807
- Byzantine calendar: 5339–5340
- Chinese calendar: 庚午年 (Metal Horse); 2528 or 2321 — to — 辛未年 (Metal Goat); 2529 or 2322
- Coptic calendar: −453 – −452
- Discordian calendar: 997
- Ethiopian calendar: −177 – −176
- Hebrew calendar: 3591–3592
- Hindu calendars
- Vikram Samvat: −113 – −112
- Shaka Samvat: N/A
- Kali Yuga: 2931–2932
- Holocene calendar: 9831
- Iranian calendar: 791 BP – 790 BP
- Islamic calendar: 815 BH – 814 BH
- Javanese calendar: N/A
- Julian calendar: N/A
- Korean calendar: 2164
- Minguo calendar: 2081 before ROC 民前2081年
- Nanakshahi calendar: −1637
- Seleucid era: 142/143 AG
- Thai solar calendar: 373–374
- Tibetan calendar: ལྕགས་ཕོ་རྟ་ལོ་ (male Iron-Horse) −43 or −424 or −1196 — to — ལྕགས་མོ་ལུག་ལོ་ (female Iron-Sheep) −42 or −423 or −1195

Year 170 BC was a year of the pre-Julian Roman calendar. At the time it was known as the Year of the Consulship of Mancinus and Serranus (or, less frequently, year 584 Ab urbe condita). The denomination 170 BC for this year has been used since the early medieval period, when the Anno Domini calendar era became the prevalent method in Europe for naming years.

== Events ==
=== By place ===
==== Greece ====
- In Thessaly, King Perseus of Macedon repulses a Roman army which is commanded by Aulus Hostilius Mancinus. Meanwhile, the Thracian city of Abdera is sacked by Roman and Pergamese troops.

==== Egypt ====
- With the guardians of the young king Ptolemy VI Philometor demanding the return of Coele-Syria to Egyptian control, the Seleucid king, Antiochus IV Epiphanes, decides on a preemptive strike against Egypt and invades the country, conquering all but the city of Alexandria. He is also able to capture Ptolemy VI.
- Antiochus IV decides to let Ptolemy VI continue as king of Egypt, but as his puppet. He does this to minimise any reaction from Rome towards his invasion. Antiochus IV then departs Egypt to deal with disturbances in Palestine, but he safeguards his access to Egypt with a strong garrison in Pelusium.
- With Antiochus IV now absent from the country, the citizens of Alexandria choose Ptolemy VI's brother Ptolemy VIII Euergetes II as their king. The two Ptolemy brothers agree to rule Egypt jointly with their sister Cleopatra II and Coele Syria is invaded by the Egyptian forces.

==== Seleucid Empire ====
- The usurped high priest of Judea, Jason, does not abandon his claims to being the high priest which he has lost to Menelaus two years earlier. While Antiochus IV is waging war against Egypt, he succeeds in making himself master of Jerusalem once more and forces Menelaus to seek refuge in the citadel.

==== Bactria ====
- Around this time, Eucratides, who is either a rebellious Bactrian official or a cousin of the Seleucid king Antiochus IV Epiphanes, captures the throne of the Greco-Bactrian Kingdom by toppling the Euthydemid dynasty's king Antimachus I.

== Births ==
- Dionysios Thrax, a Hellenic grammarian who will live and work in Alexandria and later on Rhodes (d. 90 BC)
- Lucius Accius (or Lucius Attius), Roman tragic poet and literary scholar (d. c. 86 BC)
- Apollonia Senmothis, Greek-Egyptian businesswoman.
