= 99 BC =

99 BC in various calendars
- Gregorian calendar: 99 BC; XCIX BC
- Ab urbe condita: 655
- Ancient Egypt era: XXXIII dynasty, 225
- Pharaoh: Ptolemy X Alexander, 9
- Ancient Greek Olympiad (summer): 170th Olympiad, year 2
- Assyrian calendar: 4652
- Balinese saka calendar: N/A
- Bengali calendar: −692 – −691
- Berber calendar: 852
- Buddhist calendar: 446
- Burmese calendar: −736
- Byzantine calendar: 5410–5411
- Chinese calendar: 辛巳年 (Metal Snake); 2599 or 2392 — to — 壬午年 (Water Horse); 2600 or 2393
- Coptic calendar: −382 – −381
- Discordian calendar: 1068
- Ethiopian calendar: −106 – −105
- Hebrew calendar: 3662–3663
- Hindu calendars
- Vikram Samvat: −42 – −41
- Shaka Samvat: N/A
- Kali Yuga: 3002–3003
- Holocene calendar: 9902
- Iranian calendar: 720 BP – 719 BP
- Islamic calendar: 742 BH – 741 BH
- Javanese calendar: N/A
- Julian calendar: N/A
- Korean calendar: 2235
- Minguo calendar: 2010 before ROC 民前2010年
- Nanakshahi calendar: −1566
- Seleucid era: 213/214 AG
- Thai solar calendar: 444–445
- Tibetan calendar: ལྕགས་མོ་སྦྲུལ་ལོ་ (female Iron-Snake); 28 or −353 or −1125 — to — ཆུ་ཕོ་རྟ་ལོ་ (male Water-Horse); 29 or −352 or −1124

Year 99 BC was a year of the pre-Julian Roman calendar. At the time it was known as the Year of the Consulship of Antonius and Albinus (or, less frequently, year 655 Ab urbe condita) and the Second Year of Tianhan. The denomination 99 BC for this year has been used since the early medieval period, when the Anno Domini calendar era became the prevalent method in Europe for naming years.

== Events ==
=== By place ===
==== Roman Republic ====
- Consuls: Aulus Postumius Albinus and Marcus Antonius.

==== Asia ====
- Han-Xiongnu War

- The Han general Li Guangli marches west from Jiuquan with 30,000 cavalrymen to attack the Tuqi King of the Right in the Tian Shan Mountains. After an initial victory, the Han are surrounded, and they lose more than 20,000 men while breaking out of the encirclement.
- The Han generals Lu Bode and Gongsun Ao march into the Zhuoxie Mountains, but they encounter no Xiongnu forces and turn back.
- Autumn – The Han general Li Ling leads 5000 crack infantry and a cavalry force from Juyan Lake into the eastern Altay Mountains but is pursued by Qiedihou Chanyu. After a desperate fighting retreat across more than 500 km of Xiongnu territory, the Han expedition runs out of arrows. Li Ling surrenders and his force disintegrates in the Tihan Mountains, about 50 km from the Great Wall of China.
- Emperor Wu of Han has the 'Grand Historian' Sima Qian castrated after the latter argues in defense of Li Ling's surrender.

== Births ==
- Lucretius, Latin prominent philosopher and poet (d. c. 55 BC)
