= 90 BC =

90 BC in various calendars
- Gregorian calendar: 90 BC; XC BC
- Ab urbe condita: 664
- Ancient Egypt era: XXXIII dynasty, 234
- Pharaoh: Ptolemy X Alexander, 18
- Ancient Greek Olympiad (summer): 172nd Olympiad, year 3
- Assyrian calendar: 4661
- Balinese saka calendar: N/A
- Bengali calendar: −683 – −682
- Berber calendar: 861
- Buddhist calendar: 455
- Burmese calendar: −727
- Byzantine calendar: 5419–5420
- Chinese calendar: 庚寅年 (Metal Tiger); 2608 or 2401 — to — 辛卯年 (Metal Rabbit); 2609 or 2402
- Coptic calendar: −373 – −372
- Discordian calendar: 1077
- Ethiopian calendar: −97 – −96
- Hebrew calendar: 3671–3672
- Hindu calendars
- Vikram Samvat: −33 – −32
- Shaka Samvat: N/A
- Kali Yuga: 3011–3012
- Holocene calendar: 9911
- Iranian calendar: 711 BP – 710 BP
- Islamic calendar: 733 BH – 732 BH
- Javanese calendar: N/A
- Julian calendar: N/A
- Korean calendar: 2244
- Minguo calendar: 2001 before ROC 民前2001年
- Nanakshahi calendar: −1557
- Seleucid era: 222/223 AG
- Thai solar calendar: 453–454
- Tibetan calendar: ལྕགས་ཕོ་སྟག་ལོ་ (male Iron-Tiger); 37 or −344 or −1116 — to — ལྕགས་མོ་ཡོས་ལོ་ (female Iron-Hare); 38 or −343 or −1115

Year 90 BC was a year of the pre-Julian Roman calendar. At the time it was known as the Year of the Consulship of Caesar and Lupus (or, less frequently, year 664 Ab urbe condita) and the Third Year of Zhenghe. The denomination 90 BC for this year has been used since the early medieval period, when the Anno Domini calendar era became the prevalent method in Europe for naming years.

== Events ==
=== By place ===
==== Roman Republic ====
- Consuls: Lucius Julius Caesar and Publius Rutilius Lupus.
- Social War continues: Pompeius Strabo and Gaius Marius distinguish themselves.
- The Etruscans are granted Roman citizenship.
- Corfinium in south-central Italy is the center of a rebellion against Rome.
- The Lex Iulia grants citizenship to all Italians who did not oppose Rome during the Social War.
- Cicero starts to serve in the Roman army.

==== Asia Minor ====
- Arshak I becomes king of Caucasian Iberia after overthrowing Farnadjom.
- Nicomedes IV of Bithynia is defeated in battle by a coalition of Nicomedes' brother Socrates, and Mithridates VI of Pontus. Nicomedes flees to Rome.

==== China ====
- The Xiongnu invade the Prefectures of Wuyuan and Jiuquan and kill the commandants of both Prefectures.
- Emperor Wu of Han sends three armies against the Xiongnu under General-in-Chief Li Guangli, Ma Tong and Shang Qiucheng, marching from Wuyuan, Jiuqian and Xihe respectively. An army of Central Asian vassals of Han, under Cheng Mian, captures the king of the vassal state of Jushi, who is suspected of treachery. The Xiongnu General-in-Chief and the former Han general Li Ling fight indecisively against Shang's army.
- Li Guangli and his in-law Prime Minister Liu Qumao seek to recommend Liu Bo, Li Guangli's nephew, as the new Crown Prince, and while Li Guangli is on campaign, Liu Qumao and his wife are executed and Li Guangli's wife imprisoned, having been charged with cursing the emperor and seeking to replace him with Liu Bo.
- Wishing to please the emperor, Li Guangli and his 70,000 men penetrate as far as the Selenga River. A detachment crosses the river and defeats an army of 20,000 under the Xiongnu Left General-in-Chief, who is killed. However, Li Guangli is then defeated by Hulugu Chanyu's army of 50,000 in the Khangai Mountains and surrenders. Li Guangli marries Hulugu's daughter, and Emperor Wu exterminates Li's clan.

== Births ==
- Aulus Hirtius, Roman politician and historian (d. 43 BC)
- Diodorus Siculus, Greek historian (approximate date)
- Pasherienptah III, Egyptian high priest (d. 41 BC)

== Deaths ==
- Antiochus X Eusebes, Seleucid king (approximate date)
- Dionysios Trax, Greek grammarian (b. 170 BC)
- Li Yannian, Chinese musician (executed by Wu of Han)
- Pharnajom, king of Iberia (modern Georgia)
