= Cyrus (architect) =

Cyrus (died 52 BC) was an architect at Rome from before 60 BC to his death in 52. He was an acquaintance of and erstwhile builder for Cicero and his family, and his unexpected death on January 18, 52 BC, is said to have brought about one of the most tumultuous events of the late Republic, the murder of Publius Clodius Pulcher, which took place on the same day.

== Career ==
Cyrus had certain pretensions with regard to his skill and art, which Cicero termed the Cyropaedia, in reference to the work of Xenophon. When Atticus remarked upon the narrowness of the windows that Cyrus had built, Cicero replied that he had made the same observation, and been told by Cyrus that gardens are better viewed through narrow windows than broad ones, owing to the diffusion of rays of light. Cicero stated that Cyrus would produce a similar explanation for any criticism that would be expensive for him to change.

In 56, Cyrus was engaged in constructing a building for Cicero's brother, Quintus, who was then in Sardinia. Cicero reported that progress was slow, which he attributed to the impending aedileship of Publius Clodius Pulcher, although he reassured Quintus that he was pressing Cyrus to continue the work.

Cyrus had manumitted a slave, Chrysippus Vettius, who was a friend of Cicero's, and who informed Cicero of the affairs of his former protégé, Gaius Trebatius Testa, who was with Caesar in Gaul early in 53 BC. In his letter to Trebatius, Cicero mentions that he was glad to hear that he was still remembered fondly, and pleased to learn that Trebatius was on good terms with Caesar. He also chides Trebatius for not writing more often.

In January of 52 BC, Cyrus was working at Rome for Clodius, then a candidate for the praetorship. The election had twice been delayed by clashes between armed gangs supporting Clodius and one of his chief rivals, Titus Annius Milo, who was a candidate for the consulship. According to Gaius Cassinius Schola of Interamna, an intimate friend of Clodius, Clodius was at Aricia (Note: In the passage where Cicero mentions Cassinius, he actually states that according to the witness, Clodius was at Interamna and Rome on the same day; but elsewhere he mentions that Clodius had planned to spend the day at his villa in the Alban Hills, and it is well-documented that Clodius set out from Aricia. Since he was killed near Bovillae, he was at neither Interamna nor Rome on the day of his death. It is not apparent whether Cicero erred in characterizing Cassinius' testimony, since he had just mentioned Interamna as Cassinius' home, or whether he deliberately mischaracterized it for rhetorical effect.) when word arrived from Rome that his architect had died. Clodius then set out for Rome along the Appian Way, in order to determine the state of affairs of Cyrus' work. On his way north, near Bovillae, his party fell in with that of Milo, who was headed for Lanuvium, and the rival bodyguards started a fracas in which Clodius was slain. Cicero's unsuccessful defense of Milo on the charge of murdering Clodius was the subject of his oration, Pro Milone.

== Bibliography ==
- Marcus Tullius Cicero, Epistulae ad Atticum, Epistulae ad Familiares, Epistulae ad Quintum Fratrem, Pro Milone.
- Dictionary of Greek and Roman Biography and Mythology, William Smith, ed., Little, Brown and Company, Boston (1849).
