= 33 BC =

33 BC in various calendars
- Gregorian calendar: 33 BC; XXXIII BC
- Ab urbe condita: 721
- Ancient Egypt era: XXXIII dynasty, 291
- Pharaoh: Cleopatra VII, 19
- Ancient Greek Olympiad (summer): 186th Olympiad, year 4
- Assyrian calendar: 4718
- Balinese saka calendar: N/A
- Bengali calendar: −626 – −625
- Berber calendar: 918
- Buddhist calendar: 512
- Burmese calendar: −670
- Byzantine calendar: 5476–5477
- Chinese calendar: 丁亥年 (Fire Pig); 2665 or 2458 — to — 戊子年 (Earth Rat); 2666 or 2459
- Coptic calendar: −316 – −315
- Discordian calendar: 1134
- Ethiopian calendar: −40 – −39
- Hebrew calendar: 3728–3729
- Hindu calendars
- Vikram Samvat: 24–25
- Shaka Samvat: N/A
- Kali Yuga: 3068–3069
- Holocene calendar: 9968
- Iranian calendar: 654 BP – 653 BP
- Islamic calendar: 674 BH – 673 BH
- Javanese calendar: N/A
- Julian calendar: 33 BC; XXXIII BC
- Korean calendar: 2301
- Minguo calendar: 1944 before ROC 民前1944年
- Nanakshahi calendar: −1500
- Seleucid era: 279/280 AG
- Thai solar calendar: 510–511
- Tibetan calendar: མེ་མོ་ཕག་ལོ་ (female Fire-Boar); 94 or −287 or −1059 — to — ས་ཕོ་བྱི་བ་ལོ་ (male Earth-Rat); 95 or −286 or −1058

Year 33 BC was either a common year starting on Saturday, Sunday or Monday or a leap year starting on Sunday of the Julian calendar (the sources differ, see leap year error for further information) and a leap year starting on Saturday of the Proleptic Julian calendar. At the time, it was known as the Year of the Consulship of Octavian and Tullus (or, less frequently, year 721 Ab urbe condita). The denomination 33 BC for this year has been used since the early medieval period, when the Anno Domini calendar era became the prevalent method in Europe for naming years.

== Events ==
=== By place ===
==== Roman Republic ====
- Gaius Julius Caesar Octavian becomes consul for the second time. His partner is Lucius Volcatius Tullus. Octavian delivers a speech; de summa Republica in the Roman Senate, in which he subjects the Donations.
- The second term of the Second Triumvirate expires.
- Marcus Vipsanius Agrippa is self demoted to Aedile, and builds the Aqua Julia, one of the aqueducts on which Rome's water supply depends, as well as cleaning the Cloaca Maxima sewerage system.
- Mark Antony annexes the kingdom of Media and arranges the marriage of his son Alexander Helios with princess Iotapa, the daughter of king Artavasdes I.
- The Kinambroi surrender to Octavian.

==== China ====
- Crown Prince Ao ascends to the throne as Emperor Cheng of Han of the Han dynasty (until 7 BC).

== Deaths ==
- July 8 – Yuan of Han, Chinese emperor of the Han dynasty (b. 75 BC)
- Tiberius Claudius Nero, Roman politician and father of Tiberius (b. 85 BC)
