= 120 BC =

120 BC in various calendars
- Gregorian calendar: 120 BC; CXX BC
- Ab urbe condita: 634
- Ancient Egypt era: XXXIII dynasty, 204
- Pharaoh: Ptolemy VIII Physcon, 26
- Ancient Greek Olympiad (summer): 165th Olympiad (victor)¹
- Assyrian calendar: 4631
- Balinese saka calendar: N/A
- Bengali calendar: −713 – −712
- Berber calendar: 831
- Buddhist calendar: 425
- Burmese calendar: −757
- Byzantine calendar: 5389–5390
- Chinese calendar: 庚申年 (Metal Monkey); 2578 or 2371 — to — 辛酉年 (Metal Rooster); 2579 or 2372
- Coptic calendar: −403 – −402
- Discordian calendar: 1047
- Ethiopian calendar: −127 – −126
- Hebrew calendar: 3641–3642
- Hindu calendars
- Vikram Samvat: −63 – −62
- Shaka Samvat: N/A
- Kali Yuga: 2981–2982
- Holocene calendar: 9881
- Iranian calendar: 741 BP – 740 BP
- Islamic calendar: 764 BH – 763 BH
- Javanese calendar: N/A
- Julian calendar: N/A
- Korean calendar: 2214
- Minguo calendar: 2031 before ROC 民前2031年
- Nanakshahi calendar: −1587
- Seleucid era: 192/193 AG
- Thai solar calendar: 423–424
- Tibetan calendar: ལྕགས་ཕོ་སྤྲེ་ལོ་ (male Iron-Monkey); 7 or −374 or −1146 — to — ལྕགས་མོ་བྱ་ལོ་ (female Iron-Bird); 8 or −373 or −1145

Year 120 BC was a year of the pre-Julian Roman calendar. At the time it was known as the Year of the Consulship of Manilius and Carbo (or, less frequently, year 634 Ab urbe condita) and the Third Year of Yuanshou. The denomination 120 BC for this year has been used since the early medieval period, when the Anno Domini calendar era became the prevalent method in Europe for naming years.

== Osroene ==
In this year the kingdom of Osroene is founded. The kingdom would last until 244 AD

== Events ==
=== By place ===
==== Europe ====
- The Teutons and the Cimbri migrate south and west to the Danube valley where they encounter the expanding Roman Republic (approximate date).

==== Asia Minor ====
- Mithridates VI Eupator becomes king of Pontus.

==== China ====
- Retaliating against the Han conquest of the Hexi Corridor in the previous year, the Xiongnu invade the provinces of Youbeiping and Dingxiang, killing or capturing over 1000 inhabitants.

== Births ==
- May 21 – Aurelia Cotta, mother of Julius Caesar (d. 54 BC)
- Berenice III, reigning Queen of Egypt (d. 80 BC)
- Lucius Cornelius Sisenna, writer and politician (d. 67 BC)
- Verres, corrupt praetor (approximate date) (d. 43 BC)

== Deaths ==
- Hipparchus, Greek astronomer and mathematician, on Rhodes (approximate date) (b. c. 190 BC)
