= 85 BC =

85 BC in various calendars
- Gregorian calendar: 85 BC; LXXXV BC
- Ab urbe condita: 669
- Ancient Egypt era: XXXIII dynasty, 239
- Pharaoh: Ptolemy IX Lathyros, 4
- Ancient Greek Olympiad (summer): 173rd Olympiad, year 4
- Assyrian calendar: 4666
- Balinese saka calendar: N/A
- Bengali calendar: −678 – −677
- Berber calendar: 866
- Buddhist calendar: 460
- Burmese calendar: −722
- Byzantine calendar: 5424–5425
- Chinese calendar: 乙未年 (Wood Goat); 2613 or 2406 — to — 丙申年 (Fire Monkey); 2614 or 2407
- Coptic calendar: −368 – −367
- Discordian calendar: 1082
- Ethiopian calendar: −92 – −91
- Hebrew calendar: 3676–3677
- Hindu calendars
- Vikram Samvat: −28 – −27
- Shaka Samvat: N/A
- Kali Yuga: 3016–3017
- Holocene calendar: 9916
- Iranian calendar: 706 BP – 705 BP
- Islamic calendar: 728 BH – 727 BH
- Javanese calendar: N/A
- Julian calendar: N/A
- Korean calendar: 2249
- Minguo calendar: 1996 before ROC 民前1996年
- Nanakshahi calendar: −1552
- Seleucid era: 227/228 AG
- Thai solar calendar: 458–459
- Tibetan calendar: ཤིང་མོ་ལུག་ལོ་ (female Wood-Sheep); 42 or −339 or −1111 — to — མེ་ཕོ་སྤྲེ་ལོ་ (male Fire-Monkey); 43 or −338 or −1110

Year 85 BC was a year of the pre-Julian Roman calendar. At the time it was known as the Year of the Consulship of Cinna and Carbo (or, less frequently, year 669 Ab urbe condita). The denomination 85 BC for this year has been used since the early medieval period, when the Anno Domini calendar era became the prevalent method in Europe for naming years.

== Events ==
=== By place ===
==== Roman Republic ====
- First Mithridatic War: Lucius Cornelius Sulla again defeats Archelaus in the decisive Battle of Orchomenus.

== Births ==
- Atia, niece of Julius Caesar and mother of Augustus (d. 43 BC)
- Marcus Junius Brutus, conspirator and assassin in the murder of Julius Caesar (approximate date)
- Tiberius Claudius Nero, Roman politician and father of Tiberius (d. 33 BC)

== Deaths ==
- Gaius Julius Caesar, Roman politician (b. c. 140 BC)
- Mnesarchus of Athens, Stoic philosopher (b. c. 160 BC)
- Lucius Valerius Flaccus
