= 60 BC =

60 BC in various calendars
- Gregorian calendar: 60 BC; LX BC
- Ab urbe condita: 694
- Ancient Egypt era: XXXIII dynasty, 264
- Pharaoh: Ptolemy XII Auletes, 21
- Ancient Greek Olympiad (summer): 180th Olympiad (victor)¹
- Assyrian calendar: 4691
- Balinese saka calendar: N/A
- Bengali calendar: −653 – −652
- Berber calendar: 891
- Buddhist calendar: 485
- Burmese calendar: −697
- Byzantine calendar: 5449–5450
- Chinese calendar: 庚申年 (Metal Monkey); 2638 or 2431 — to — 辛酉年 (Metal Rooster); 2639 or 2432
- Coptic calendar: −343 – −342
- Discordian calendar: 1107
- Ethiopian calendar: −67 – −66
- Hebrew calendar: 3701–3702
- Hindu calendars
- Vikram Samvat: −3 – −2
- Shaka Samvat: N/A
- Kali Yuga: 3041–3042
- Holocene calendar: 9941
- Iranian calendar: 681 BP – 680 BP
- Islamic calendar: 702 BH – 701 BH
- Javanese calendar: N/A
- Julian calendar: N/A
- Korean calendar: 2274
- Minguo calendar: 1971 before ROC 民前1971年
- Nanakshahi calendar: −1527
- Seleucid era: 252/253 AG
- Thai solar calendar: 483–484
- Tibetan calendar: ལྕགས་ཕོ་སྤྲེ་ལོ་ (male Iron-Monkey); 67 or −314 or −1086 — to — ལྕགས་མོ་བྱ་ལོ་ (female Iron-Bird); 68 or −313 or −1085

Year 60 BC was a year of the pre-Julian Roman calendar. At the time, it was known as the Year of the Consulship of Metellus Celer and Afranius (or, less frequently, year 694 Ab urbe condita). The denomination 60 BC for this year has been used since the early medieval period, when the Anno Domini calendar era became the prevalent method in Europe for naming years.

== Events ==
=== By place ===
==== Roman Republic ====
- Gaius Julius Caesar suppresses an uprising and conquers all of Lusitania for Rome.
- Creation of the First Triumvirate, an informal political alliance between Julius Caesar, Pompey the Great and Marcus Licinius Crassus (or 59 BC).

==== Syria ====
- The Seleucid Empire comes to an end with the last two emperors being murdered on orders from Rome.

==== China ====
- The Han dynasty government establishes the Protectorate of the Western Regions, the highest military position of a military commander on the Western frontier (Tarim Basin).

== Births ==
- Curia, wife of Quintus Lucretius Vespillo (approximate date)
- Ptolemy XIV, king (pharaoh) of Egypt (or 59 BC)
- Tryphon, Greek grammarian (approximate date)
- Daeso, emperor of Dongbuyeo

== Deaths ==
- Aretas III Philhellen, king of Nabatea (approximate date)
- Su Wu, Chinese diplomat and statesman (b. 140 BC)
