= 68 BC =

68 BC in various calendars
- Gregorian calendar: 68 BC; LXVIII BC
- Ab urbe condita: 686
- Ancient Egypt era: XXXIII dynasty, 256
- Pharaoh: Ptolemy XII Auletes, 13
- Ancient Greek Olympiad (summer): 178th Olympiad (victor)¹
- Assyrian calendar: 4683
- Balinese saka calendar: N/A
- Bengali calendar: −661 – −660
- Berber calendar: 883
- Buddhist calendar: 477
- Burmese calendar: −705
- Byzantine calendar: 5441–5442
- Chinese calendar: 壬子年 (Water Rat); 2630 or 2423 — to — 癸丑年 (Water Ox); 2631 or 2424
- Coptic calendar: −351 – −350
- Discordian calendar: 1099
- Ethiopian calendar: −75 – −74
- Hebrew calendar: 3693–3694
- Hindu calendars
- Vikram Samvat: −11 – −10
- Shaka Samvat: N/A
- Kali Yuga: 3033–3034
- Holocene calendar: 9933
- Iranian calendar: 689 BP – 688 BP
- Islamic calendar: 710 BH – 709 BH
- Javanese calendar: N/A
- Julian calendar: N/A
- Korean calendar: 2266
- Minguo calendar: 1979 before ROC 民前1979年
- Nanakshahi calendar: −1535
- Seleucid era: 244/245 AG
- Thai solar calendar: 475–476
- Tibetan calendar: ཆུ་ཕོ་བྱི་བ་ལོ་ (male Water-Rat); 59 or −322 or −1094 — to — ཆུ་མོ་གླང་ལོ་ (female Water-Ox); 60 or −321 or −1093

Year 68 BC was a year of the pre-Julian Roman calendar. At the time it was known as the Year of the Consulship of Metellus/Vatia and Rex (or, less frequently, year 686 Ab urbe condita). The denomination 68 BC for this year has been used since the early medieval period, when the Anno Domini calendar era became the prevalent method in Europe for naming years.

== Events ==
=== By place ===
==== Roman Republic ====
- Consuls: Lucius Caecilius Metellus and Quintus Marcius Rex.
- October 6 – Lucius Lucullus defeats Tigranes II of Armenia in the Battle of Artaxata.
- Gaius Antonius Hybrida elected praetor.
- Tribune of the plebs Gaius Antius Restio passes the Lex Antia sumptuaria law forbidding Roman magistrates from attending banquets.
- Ostia, the harbour city of Ancient Rome, is sacked by pirates. The port is set on fire and the consular war fleet is destroyed.

==== Osroene ====
- Abgar II becomes ruler of Osroene.

== Births ==
- Arsinoe IV of Egypt, daughter of Ptolemy XII (and probably Cleopatra V) (d. 41 BC)

== Deaths ==
- Antiochus of Ascalon, Greek philosopher (b. c. 130 BC)
- Cornelia, wife of Julius Caesar (b. 94 BC)
- Huo Guang, official of the western Han dynasty
- Lucius Caecillius Metellus, Roman consul
