= 54 BC =

54 BC in various calendars
- Gregorian calendar: 54 BC; LIV BC
- Ab urbe condita: 700
- Ancient Egypt era: XXXIII dynasty, 270
- Pharaoh: Ptolemy XII Auletes, 27
- Ancient Greek Olympiad (summer): 181st Olympiad, year 3
- Assyrian calendar: 4697
- Balinese saka calendar: N/A
- Bengali calendar: −647 – −646
- Berber calendar: 897
- Buddhist calendar: 491
- Burmese calendar: −691
- Byzantine calendar: 5455–5456
- Chinese calendar: 丙寅年 (Fire Tiger); 2644 or 2437 — to — 丁卯年 (Fire Rabbit); 2645 or 2438
- Coptic calendar: −337 – −336
- Discordian calendar: 1113
- Ethiopian calendar: −61 – −60
- Hebrew calendar: 3707–3708
- Hindu calendars
- Vikram Samvat: 3–4
- Shaka Samvat: N/A
- Kali Yuga: 3047–3048
- Holocene calendar: 9947
- Iranian calendar: 675 BP – 674 BP
- Islamic calendar: 696 BH – 695 BH
- Javanese calendar: N/A
- Julian calendar: N/A
- Korean calendar: 2280
- Minguo calendar: 1965 before ROC 民前1965年
- Nanakshahi calendar: −1521
- Seleucid era: 258/259 AG
- Thai solar calendar: 489–490
- Tibetan calendar: མེ་ཕོ་སྟག་ལོ་ (male Fire-Tiger); 73 or −308 or −1080 — to — མེ་མོ་ཡོས་ལོ་ (female Fire-Hare); 74 or −307 or −1079

Year 54 BC was a year of the pre-Julian Roman calendar. At the time, it was known as the Year of the Consulship of Appius and Ahenobarbus (or, less frequently, year 700 Ab urbe condita). The denomination 54 BC for this year has been used since the early medieval period, when the Anno Domini calendar era became the prevalent method in Europe for naming years.

== Events ==
=== By place ===
==== Roman Republic ====
- Consuls: Appius Claudius Pulcher and Lucius Domitius Ahenobarbus.
- Fifth year of Julius Caesar's Gallic Wars:
  - July – Second of Caesar's Invasions of Britain: Julius Caesar receives nominal submission from the tribal chief Cassivellaunus and installs Mandubracius as a friendly king.
  - Winter – Ambiorix revolts in Gaul. He joins with Catuvolcus in an uprising against the Roman army. Caesar's senior officers Lucius Aurunculeius Cotta and Quintus Titurius Sabinus are ambushed by the Eburones, and killed along with almost their entire forces.
- Pompey builds the first permanent theatre in Rome.
- Crassus arrives in Syria as proconsul and invades the Parthian Empire, initiating the Roman–Persian Wars, which were to last nearly seven centuries.
- Octavia the Younger and Gaius Claudius Marcellus marry.

== Births ==
- Gnaeus Cornelius Lentulus, Roman consul (d. AD 25)
- Seneca the Elder, Roman Rhetorician and writer
- Tibullus, Roman poet and writer (d. 19 BC)

== Deaths ==
- July 31 – Aurelia Cotta, mother of Julius Caesar (b. 120 BC)
- Ariovistus, leader of the Suebi (approximated date)
- Gaius Valerius Catullus, Roman poet and writer (b. 84 BC)
- Huo Chengjun, empress of the Han dynasty
- Julia, daughter of Julius Caesar (dies in childbirth)
- Lucius Aurunculeius Cotta, Roman legate of Julius Caesar
- Lucius Gellius Publicola, Roman politician (approximate date)
- Lucius Valerius Flaccus, Roman tribune and praetor
- Mithridates IV, king of Parthia (executed by Orodes II)
- Quintus Laberius Durus, Roman tribune of Julius Caesar
- Quintus Titurius Sabinus, Roman legate of Julius Caesar
