= Pacuvius Labeo =

Roman jurist and assassin of Caesar

Pacuvius Labeo (died 42 BC) was a Roman jurist and senator, and one of the murderers of Julius Caesar. He was father of the more eminent jurist Marcus Antistius Labeo, who lived under the emperor Augustus.

== Biography ==
Pacuvius was one of the disciples of Servius Sulpicius Rufus, who are stated by Sextus Pomponius to have written books which were digested by Aufidius Namusa. Aulus Gellius mentioned him as the recipient of a letter by Sinnius Capito in a discussion about grammar.

Pacuvius joined the conspiracy of Brutus to assassinate the dictator Julius Caesar. He was probably a senator by then, but his career up to that point is unrecorded. Pacuvius was one of the most enthusiastic among the conspirators, and took an active role in the recruiting process. He was present at the Battle of Philippi on Brutus's side. After the defeat, he was unwilling to survive Brutus, who, he was told, had pronounced his name with a sigh before his death. Having dug in his tent a hole of the length of his body, he settled his worldly affairs, and sent messages to his wife and children. Then, taking the hand of his most faithful slave, he turned him round (as was usual in the ceremony of manumission), and, giving him his sword, presented his throat to be stabbed, and was buried in his tent in the hole which he had dug.

His name was formerly thought to be "Pacuvius Antistius Labeo", but Ernst Badian has shown that this is an unlikely name for a senator of his time, and noted that the name "Antistius" is only attested by a corrupt passage in the Digest. Pacuvius's son, Antistius Labeo, will then have acquired his own name through adoption. Pacuvius's entry in the DGRBM (1849) gives his name as "Quintus Antistius Labeo", but this is confirmed by no other source.
