= 70 BC =

100 BC in various calendars
- Gregorian calendar: 100 BC; C BC
- Ab urbe condita: 654
- Ancient Egypt era: XXXIII dynasty, 224
- Pharaoh: Ptolemy X Alexander, 8
- Ancient Greek Olympiad (summer): 170th Olympiad (victor)¹
- Assyrian calendar: 4651
- Balinese saka calendar: N/A
- Bengali calendar: −693 – −692
- Berber calendar: 851
- Buddhist calendar: 445
- Burmese calendar: −737
- Byzantine calendar: 5409–5410
- Chinese calendar: 庚辰年 (Metal Dragon); 2598 or 2391 — to — 辛巳年 (Metal Snake); 2599 or 2392
- Coptic calendar: −383 – −382
- Discordian calendar: 1067
- Ethiopian calendar: −107 – −106
- Hebrew calendar: 3661–3662
- Hindu calendars
- Vikram Samvat: −43 – −42
- Shaka Samvat: N/A
- Kali Yuga: 3001–3002
- Holocene calendar: 9901
- Iranian calendar: 721 BP – 720 BP
- Islamic calendar: 743 BH – 742 BH
- Javanese calendar: N/A
- Julian calendar: N/A
- Korean calendar: 2234
- Minguo calendar: 2011 before ROC 民前2011年
- Nanakshahi calendar: −1567
- Seleucid era: 212/213 AG
- Thai solar calendar: 443–444
- Tibetan calendar: ལྕགས་ཕོ་འབྲུག་ལོ་ (male Iron-Dragon); 27 or −354 or −1126 — to — ལྕགས་མོ་སྦྲུལ་ལོ་ (female Iron-Snake); 28 or −353 or −1125

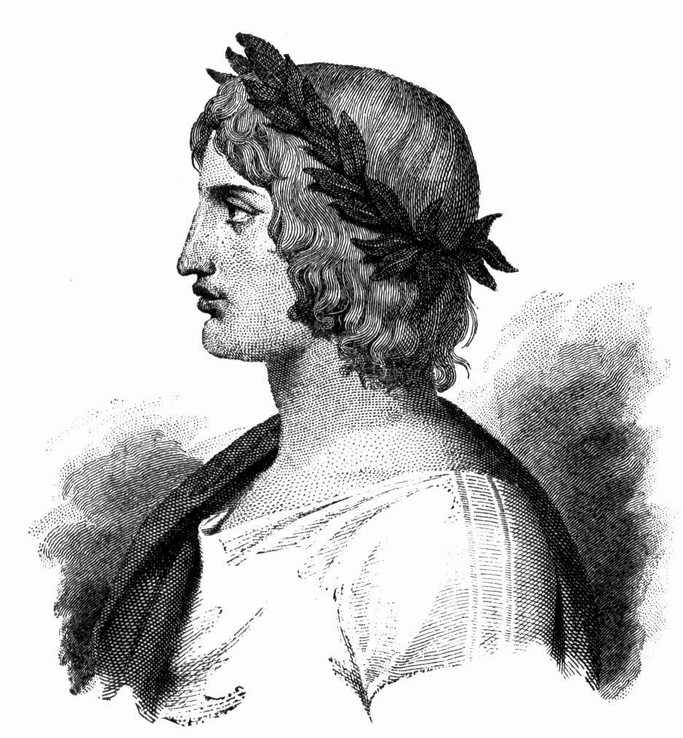
Depiction of Virgil (70–19 BC)

Year 70 BC was a year of the pre-Julian Roman calendar. At the time it was known as the Year of the Consulship of Pompeius and Crassus (or, less frequently, year 684 Ab urbe condita). The denomination 70 BC for this year has been used since the early medieval period, when the Anno Domini calendar era became the prevalent method in Europe for naming years.

During this year, the consulship of Pompeius and Crassus marked a turning point in Roman politics, as they reversed several of Sulla's constitutional reforms. Powers of the tribunate were restored, and equestrians were once again permitted to serve as jurors, reshaping the balance of authority between the Senate and the people.

Notable births in 70 BC include the Roman poet Virgil (Publius Vergilius Maro), born on October 15 in Andes near Mantua. Virgil would later author the Aeneid, a cornerstone of Latin literature that profoundly influenced Western literary tradition. Other figures born around this time include Crinagoras of Mytilene, a Greek epigrammatist and diplomat, and Gaius Maecenas, a Roman political advisor and patron of the arts.

In various calendar systems, 70 BC corresponds approximately to:

- Roman calendar: Year of the Consulship of Pompeius and Crassus, or year 684 Ab urbe condita
- Gregorian calendar (proleptic): 70 BC
- Hebrew calendar: 3691 AM
- Chinese calendar: Han Dynasty, reign of Emperor Xuan
- Egyptian calendar: XXXIII dynasty, under Pharaoh Ptolemy XII Auletes
- Zoroastrian calendar: approximately 800–900 years after Zoroaster

== Events ==
=== By place ===
==== Roman Republic ====
- August – In Rome, Cicero prosecutes former governor Verres; Verres exiles himself to Marseille before the trial is over.
- The office of censor is reinstated.
- Lucullus captures Sinop, then invades Armenia.

==== Parthia ====
- Phraates III becomes the king of Parthia.

== Births ==
- October 15 – Virgil, Roman poet (d. 19 BC)
- Cleopatra VII, queen of Egypt (d. 30 BC)
- Crinagoras, Greek Epigrammatist (d. 18 BC)
- Gaius Maecenas, Roman politician (d. 8 BC)

== Deaths ==
- Mithridates I, king of Commagene
- Sanatruces (or Sanatruk), king of Parthia
