= 100 BC =

100 BC in various calendars
- Gregorian calendar: 100 BC; C BC
- Ab urbe condita: 654
- Ancient Egypt era: XXXIII dynasty, 224
- Pharaoh: Ptolemy X Alexander, 8
- Ancient Greek Olympiad (summer): 170th Olympiad (victor)¹
- Assyrian calendar: 4651
- Balinese saka calendar: N/A
- Bengali calendar: −693 – −692
- Berber calendar: 851
- Buddhist calendar: 445
- Burmese calendar: −737
- Byzantine calendar: 5409–5410
- Chinese calendar: 庚辰年 (Metal Dragon); 2598 or 2391 — to — 辛巳年 (Metal Snake); 2599 or 2392
- Coptic calendar: −383 – −382
- Discordian calendar: 1067
- Ethiopian calendar: −107 – −106
- Hebrew calendar: 3661–3662
- Hindu calendars
- Vikram Samvat: −43 – −42
- Shaka Samvat: N/A
- Kali Yuga: 3001–3002
- Holocene calendar: 9901
- Iranian calendar: 721 BP – 720 BP
- Islamic calendar: 743 BH – 742 BH
- Javanese calendar: N/A
- Julian calendar: N/A
- Korean calendar: 2234
- Minguo calendar: 2011 before ROC 民前2011年
- Nanakshahi calendar: −1567
- Seleucid era: 212/213 AG
- Thai solar calendar: 443–444
- Tibetan calendar: ལྕགས་ཕོ་འབྲུག་ལོ་ (male Iron-Dragon); 27 or −354 or −1126 — to — ལྕགས་མོ་སྦྲུལ་ལོ་ (female Iron-Snake); 28 or −353 or −1125

Year 100 BC was a year of the pre-Julian Roman calendar. At the time it was known as the Year of the Consulship of Marius and Flaccus (or, less frequently, year 654 Ab urbe condita) and the First Year of Tianhan. The denomination 100 BC for this year has been used since the early medieval period, when the Anno Domini calendar era became the prevalent method in Europe for naming years.

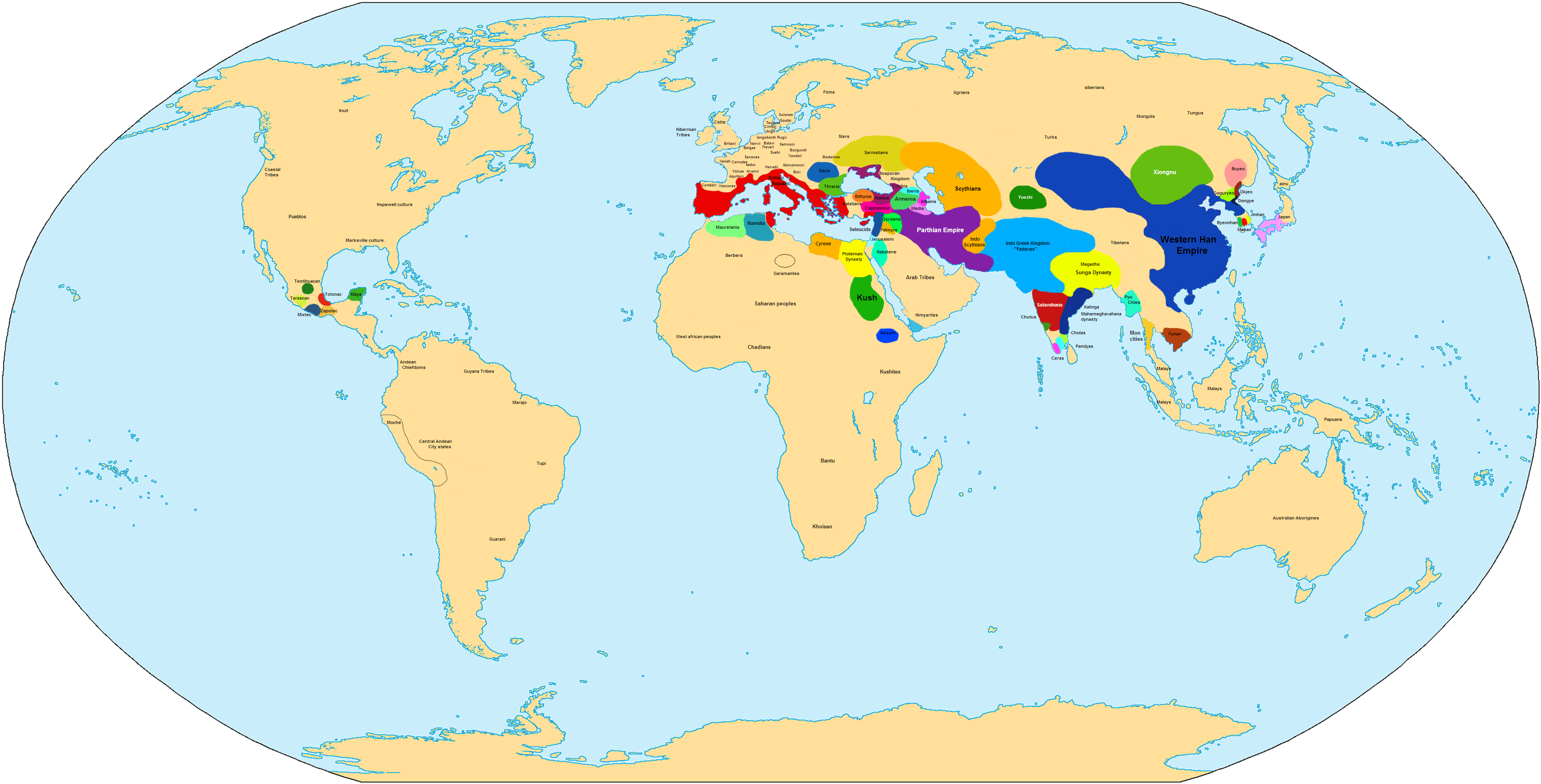
Map of the world in 100 BC

== Events ==
=== By place ===
==== Roman Republic ====
- Consuls: Lucius Valerius Flaccus, Gaius Marius (Marius's sixth consulship).
- Manius Aquillius celebrates an ovation for victories in the Second Servile War.
- Lucius Appuleius Saturninus, a tribune, passes a law to redistribute land to military veterans. The law requires that all senators swear to abide by it. Quintus Caecilus Metellus Numidicus refuses and is exiled. He goes to Rhodes to study philosophy.
- Late summer–autumn: Saturninus stands for tribune again for the following year, and is elected. His associate, the praetor Gaius Servilius Glaucia, attempts to stand for the consulship (illegally, as praetors cannot immediately become consul). A rival candidate, Gaius Memmius, is found murdered by agents of Saturninus and Glaucia, who are declared public enemies by the Senate. The Senate issues the senatus consultum ultimum, and Marius, as consul, defeats his former ally in battle in the Forum. Saturninus and his followers surrender on condition that their lives are spared, but they are stoned to death with roof tiles in the Curia Hostilia by renegade senators.
- The building of the Sanctuary of Fortuna Primigenia, Palestrina, Italy, is begun. The model of it is now kept at the Museo Archeologico Nazionale, Italy (approximate date).

==== Asia Minor ====
- Tigranes II of Armenia is placed on the Armenian throne by the Parthians in exchange for the cession of "seventy valley" (approximate date).

==== Judea ====
- The deuterocanonical books of 1 and 2 Maccabees are written.

==== India ====
- Gandhara and Punjab are ruled by the Indo-Greek king Demetrius III Aniketos.

==== China ====
- War of the Heavenly Horses: the Han expedition under Li Guangli returns victorious to China. He is followed by dynastic representatives sent by various Central Asian kings, so that they may pay tribute to Emperor Wu of Han. Emperor Wu keeps these representatives as hostages and sends soldiers to build pavilions and reclaim wasteland along the route to the west to provide food and shelter for Han envoys.
- Han-Xiongnu War: the Han general Zhao Ponu escapes Xiongnu custody and returns to China.

==== America ====
- Mural room in the Maya pyramid at San Bartolo, Guatemala, painted.
- Olmec III period ends in Southeastern Mexico.

== Births ==
- Julius Caesar, Roman general and politician (d. 44 BC)
- Titus Labienus, Caesar's chief lieutenant in the conquest of Gaul (d. 45 BC)

== Deaths ==
- Cornelia, mother of Tiberius Gracchus (b. c. 190 BC)
- Gaius Memmius, Roman politician
- Gaius Servilius Glaucia, Roman politician
- Lucius Appuleius Saturninus, Roman politician
- Salvius Tryphon, Rebel slave
- Theodosius of Bithynia, Greek astronomer and mathematician (b. c. 169 BC)
