= 44 BC =

44 BC in various calendars
- Gregorian calendar: 44 BC; XLIV BC
- Ab urbe condita: 710
- Ancient Egypt era: XXXIII dynasty, 280
- Pharaoh: Cleopatra VII, 8
- Ancient Greek Olympiad (summer): 184th Olympiad (victor)¹
- Assyrian calendar: 4707
- Balinese saka calendar: N/A
- Bengali calendar: −637 – −636
- Berber calendar: 907
- Buddhist calendar: 501
- Burmese calendar: −681
- Byzantine calendar: 5465–5466
- Chinese calendar: 丙子年 (Fire Rat); 2654 or 2447 — to — 丁丑年 (Fire Ox); 2655 or 2448
- Coptic calendar: −327 – −326
- Discordian calendar: 1123
- Ethiopian calendar: −51 – −50
- Hebrew calendar: 3717–3718
- Hindu calendars
- Vikram Samvat: 13–14
- Shaka Samvat: N/A
- Kali Yuga: 3057–3058
- Holocene calendar: 9957
- Iranian calendar: 665 BP – 664 BP
- Islamic calendar: 685 BH – 684 BH
- Javanese calendar: N/A
- Julian calendar: 44 BC; XLIV BC
- Korean calendar: 2290
- Minguo calendar: 1955 before ROC 民前1955年
- Nanakshahi calendar: −1511
- Seleucid era: 268/269 AG
- Thai solar calendar: 499–500
- Tibetan calendar: མེ་ཕོ་བྱི་བ་ལོ་ (male Fire-Rat); 83 or −298 or −1070 — to — མེ་མོ་གླང་ལོ་ (female Fire-Ox); 84 or −297 or −1069

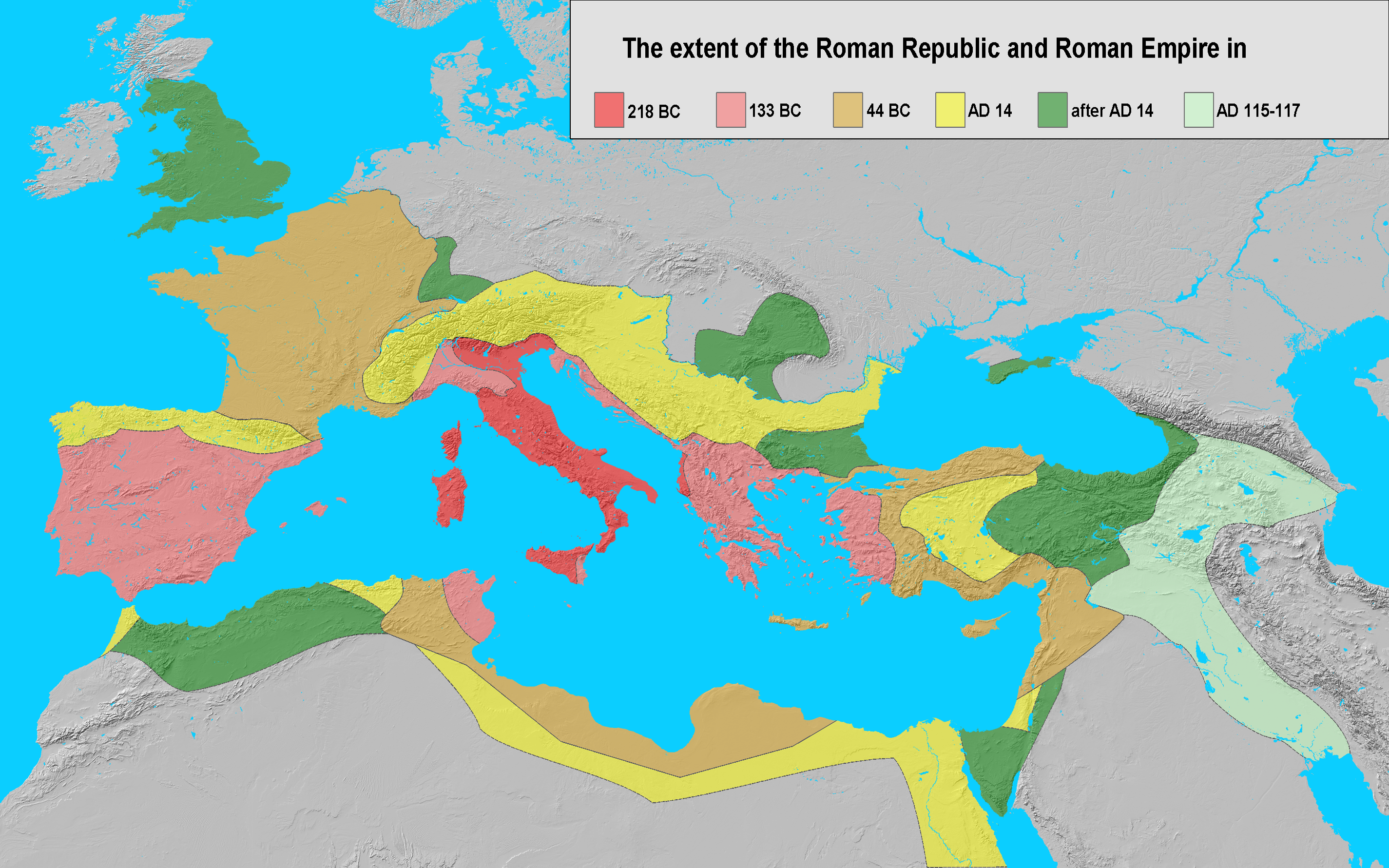
The Roman empire in 44 BC (in dark and light red and orange)

Year 44 BC was either a common year starting on Sunday, common year starting on Monday, leap year starting on Friday, or leap year starting on Saturday. (the sources differ, see leap year error for further information) and a common year starting on Sunday of the Proleptic Julian calendar. At the time, it was known as the Year of the Consulship of Julius Caesar V and Marc Antony (or, less frequently, year 710 Ab urbe condita). The denomination 44 BC for this year has been used since the early medieval period, when the Anno Domini calendar era became the prevalent method in Europe for naming years.

44 BC is well known as in the year Julius Caesar was assassinated (March 15).

== Events ==
=== By place ===
==== Roman Republic ====
- Consuls: Gaius Julius Caesar and Mark Antony.
- February – Rome celebrates the festival of the Lupercal. Mark Antony twice presents Caesar with a royal diadem, urging him to take it and declare himself king. He refuses this offer and orders the crown to be placed in the Temple of Jupiter.
- Shortly before March 15 – According to the Roman historian Livy, Mount Etna in Sicily erupts.
- March 15 (the Ides of March) – Julius Caesar, dictator of Rome, is assassinated by a group of senators, amongst them Gaius Cassius Longinus, Marcus Junius Brutus, and Caesar's Massilian naval commander, Decimus Brutus.
- March 20 – Caesar's funeral is held. Marcus Antony gives a eulogy and in his speech he makes accusations of murder and ensures a permanent breach with the conspirators against Caesar. He snatches Caesar's bloody tunic and purple toga to show the crowd the stab wounds; the citizens tear apart the forum and cremate their Caesar on a makeshift pyre. Antony becomes the highest ranking politician in Rome.
- April – Octavian returns from Apollonia in Dalmatia to Rome to take up Caesar's inheritance, against advice from Atia (his mother and Caesar's niece) and consul Antony.
- April 18–April 21 – Octavian engages in a charm offensive with consular Cicero who is fulminating against Mark Antony.
- June – Antony is granted a five-year governorship of northern and central Transalpine Gaul (France) and Cisalpine Gaul (Northern Italy).
- September 2
  - Pharaoh Cleopatra VII of Egypt declares her son co-ruler as Ptolemy XV Caesarion.
  - The first of Cicero's Philippicae (oratorical attacks) on Antony is published. He will make 14 of them over the next several months.
- December – Antony besieges Brutus Albinus in Mutina (Modena), with Octavian, an ally of Decimus, who is one of his uncle's assassins, close by.

==== Europe ====
- Comosicus succeeds Burebista as king of Dacia.

== Births ==
- Gnaeus Calpurnius Piso, Roman statesman, consul and governor (d. 20 AD)

== Deaths ==
- March 15 – Julius Caesar, Roman politician and general (assassinated in the Theatre of Pompey) (b. 100 BC)
- c. August – Ptolemy XIV, king (pharaoh) of Egypt (presumed murdered) (b. c. 59 BC)
- Burebista, Thracian king of the Getae and Dacian tribes
- Lucius Caninius Gallus, Roman politician, tribune
- Publius Servilius Vatia Isauricus, Roman consul
- Publius Sittius, Roman mercenary commander
