= 1st century BC =

One hundred years, from 100 BC to 1 BC

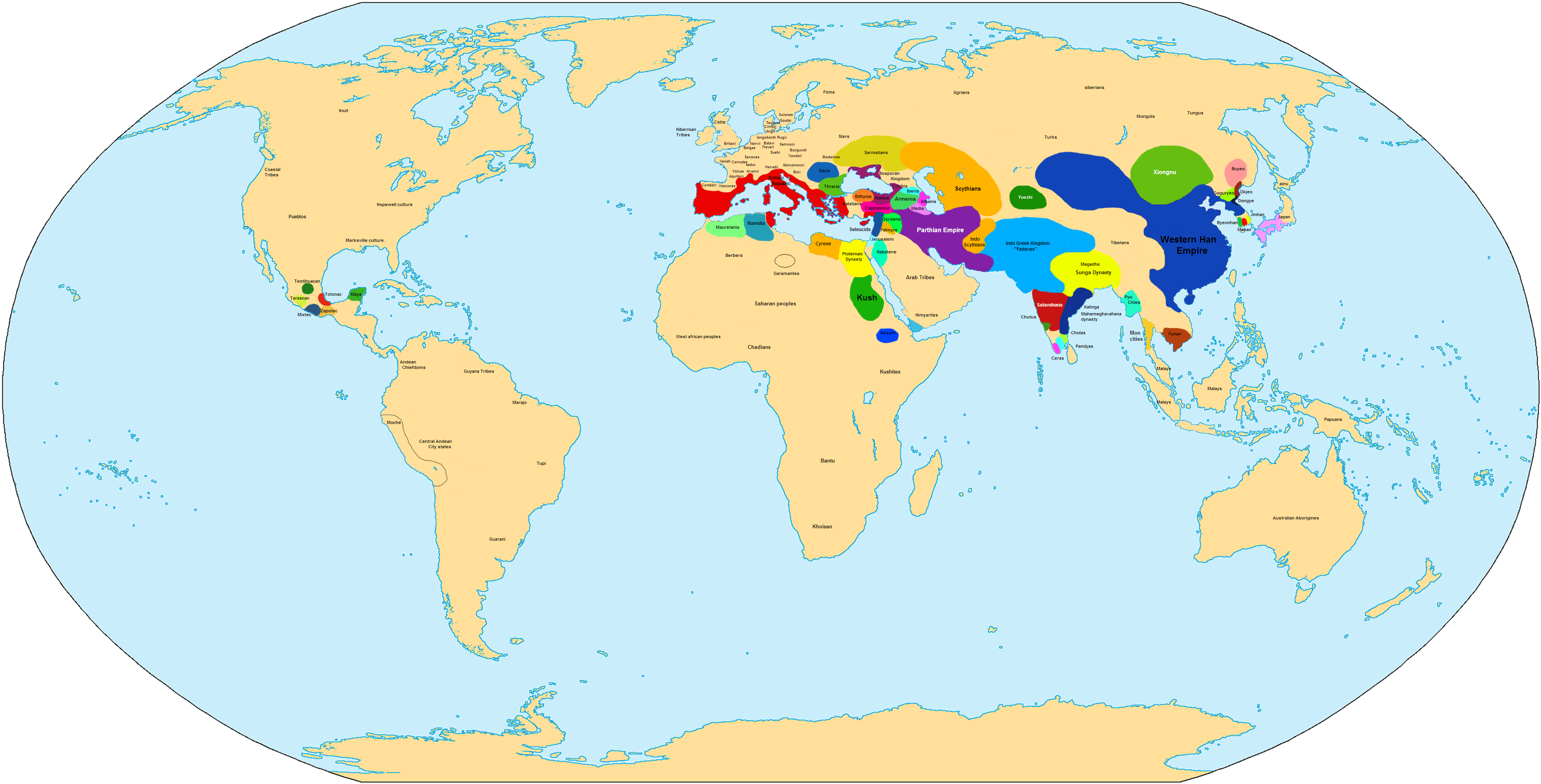
Map of the world in 100 BC, the beginning of the first century BC

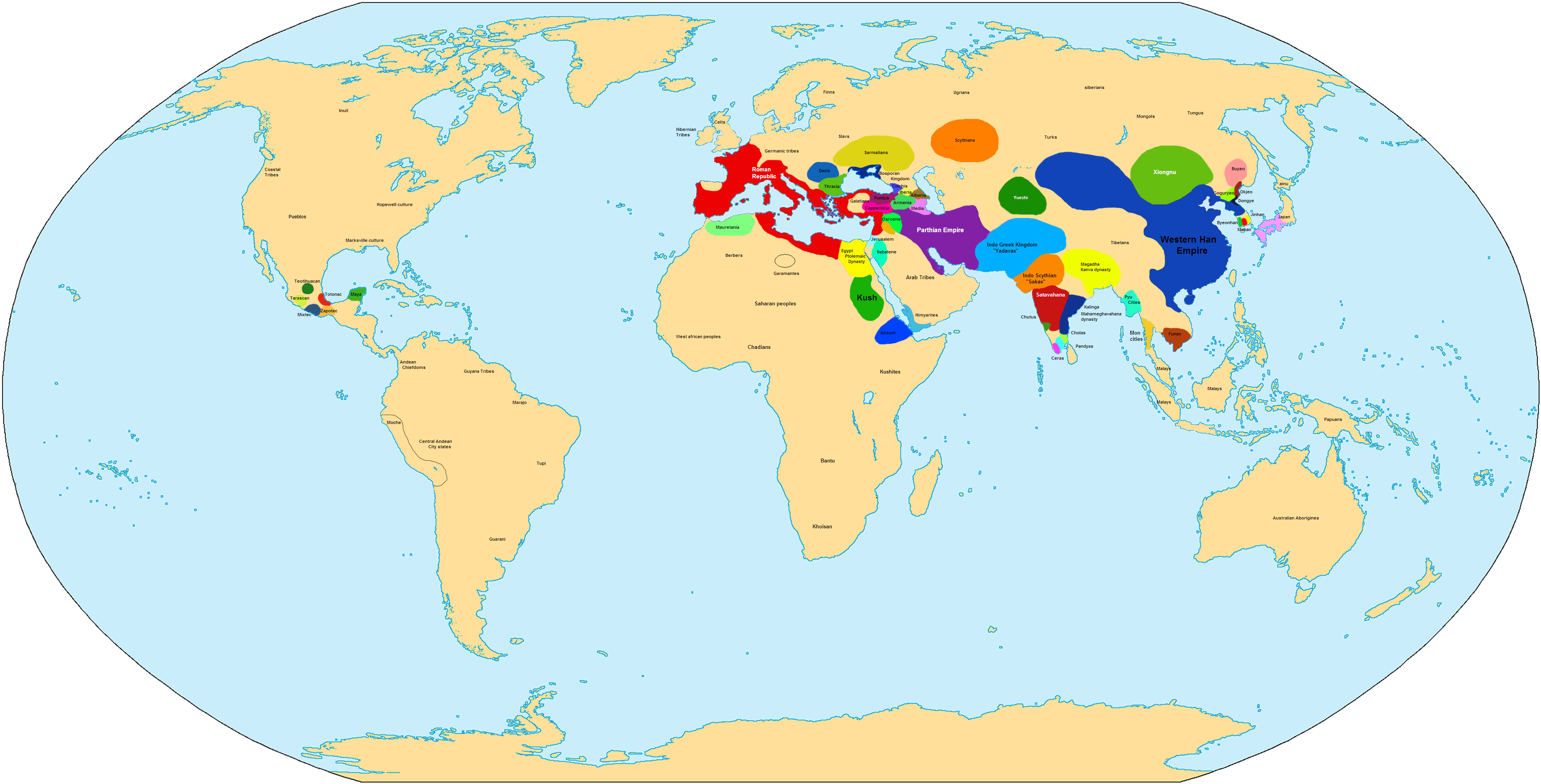
Map of the world in 50 BC

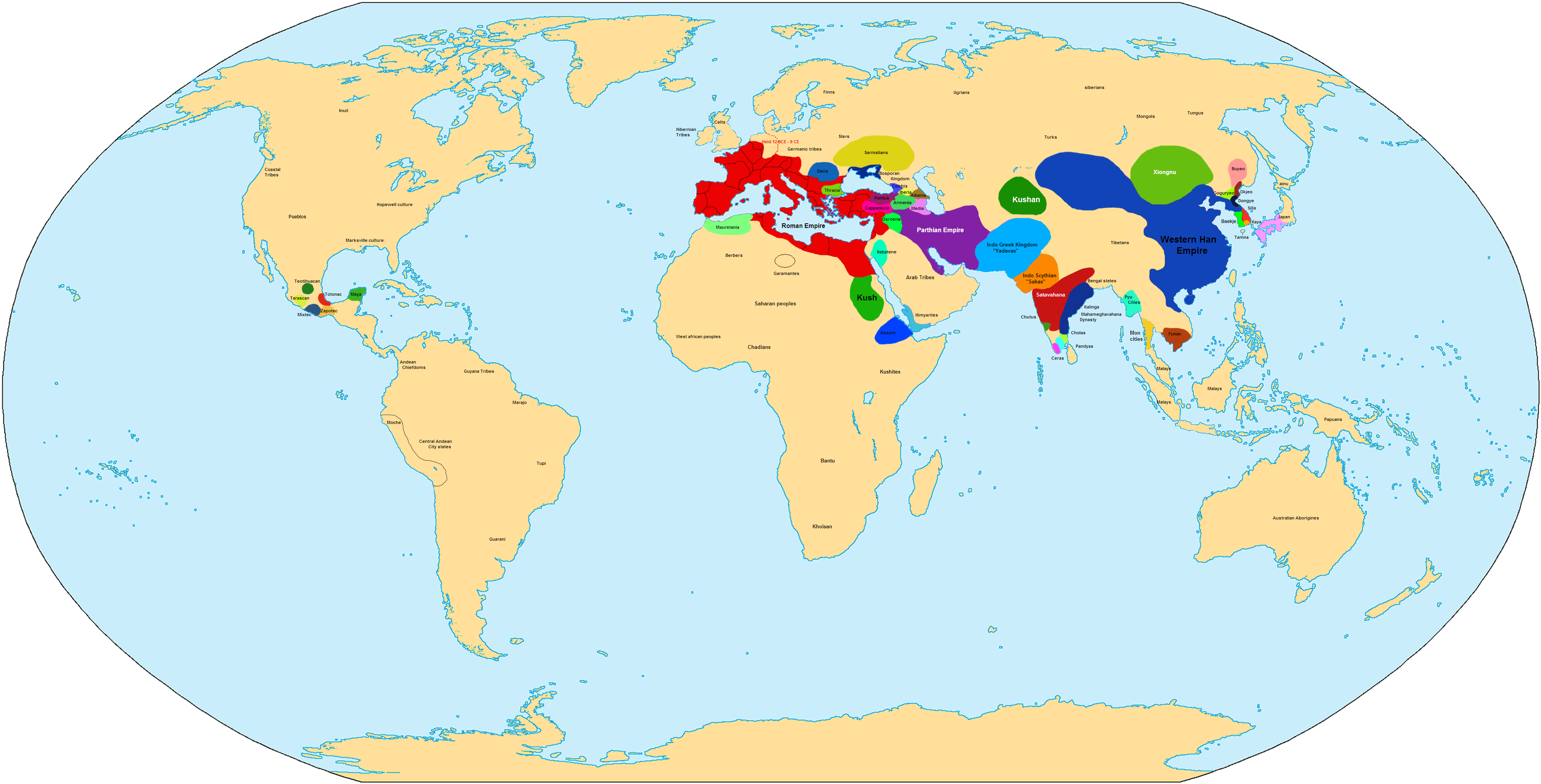
Map of the world in 1 AD, shortly after the end of the first century BC

The 1st century BC, also known as the last century BC and the last century BCE, started on the first day of 100 BC and ended on the last day of 1 BC. The AD/BC notation does not use a year zero; however, astronomical year numbering does use a zero, as well as a minus sign, so "2 BC" is equal to "year –1". 1st century AD (Anno Domini) follows.

In the course of the century, all the remaining independent lands surrounding the Mediterranean Sea were steadily brought under Roman control, being ruled either directly under governors or through puppet kings appointed by Rome. The Roman state itself was plunged into civil war several times, finally resulting in the marginalization of its 500-year-old Roman Republic, and the embodiment of total state power in a single man—the Roman emperor.

The internal turbulence that plagued Rome at this time can be seen as the death throes of the Roman Republic, as it finally gave way to the autocratic ambitions of powerful men like Sulla, Julius Caesar, Mark Antony and Octavian. Octavian's ascension to total power as the emperor Augustus is considered to mark the point in history where the Roman Republic ends and the Roman Empire begins. Some scholars refer to this event as the Roman Revolution.

In the eastern mainland, the Han dynasty began to decline and the court of China was in chaos in the latter half of this century. Trapped in a difficult situation, the Xiongnu had to begin emigration to the west or attach themselves to the Han.

== Events ==
=== 90s BC ===
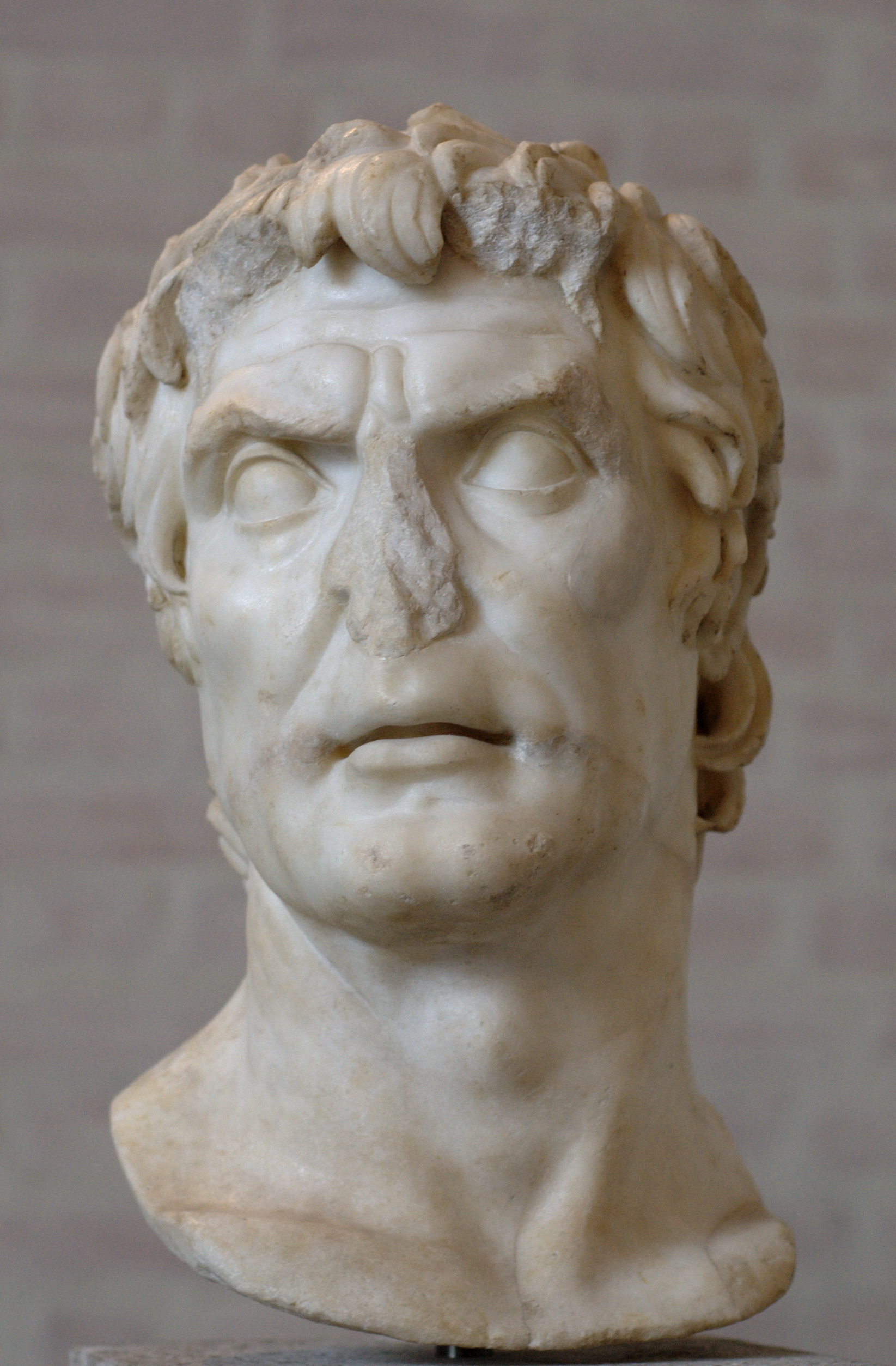
Sulla's march on Rome in 88 BC was an early step in the Crisis of the Roman Republic.

- 97 BC: Ariarathes VIII is forced out of Cappadocia by Mithridates VI of Pontus, and dies soon afterwards.
- 96 BC: Cyrene is left to the people of Rome by its ruler Ptolemy Apion.
- 96 BC: King Alexander Jannaeus of Judea wins the Siege of Gaza.
- 95 BC: Tigranes the Great becomes king of Armenia
- 93 BC: Ariobarzanes I Philoromaios becomes king of Cappadocia with Roman backing.
- 91 BC: The assassination of Marcus Livius Drusus leads to the Social War (91–87 BC) in Italy
- 91 BC: Crown Prince Ju Revolt in China.

=== 80s BC ===
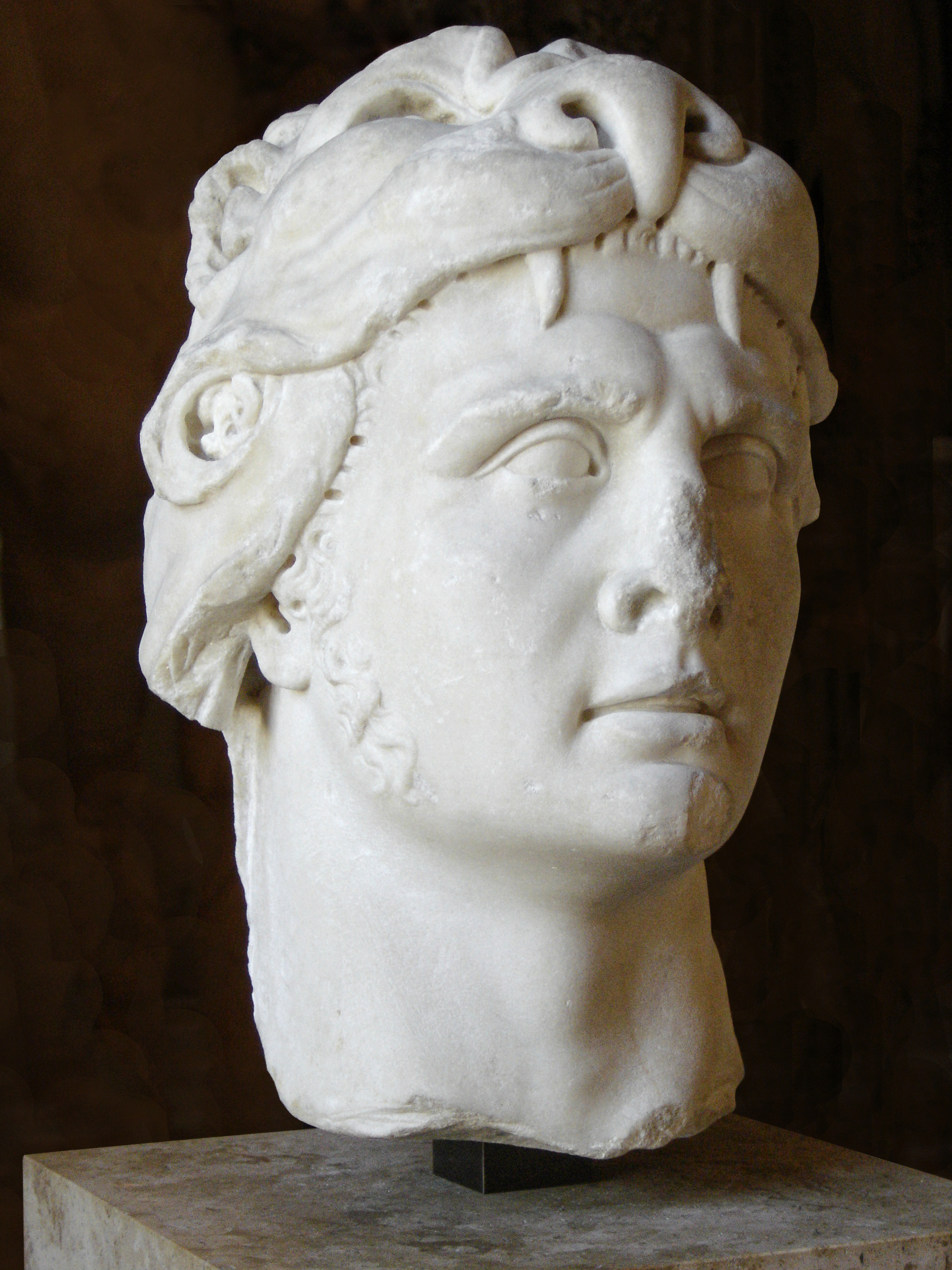
Mithridates VI of Pontus

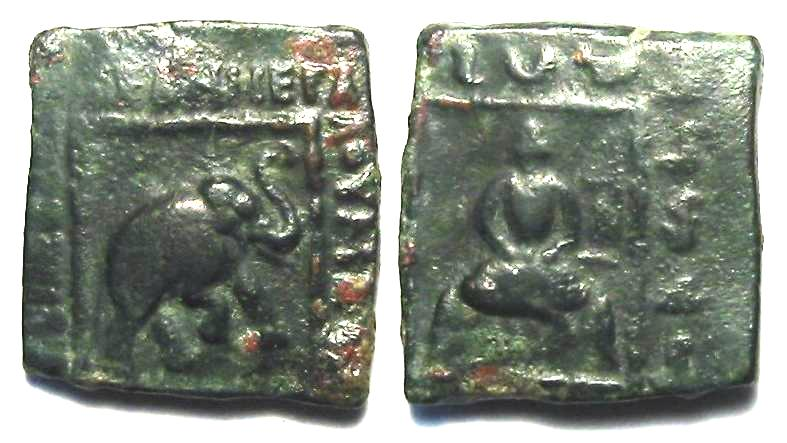
Coin of Maues

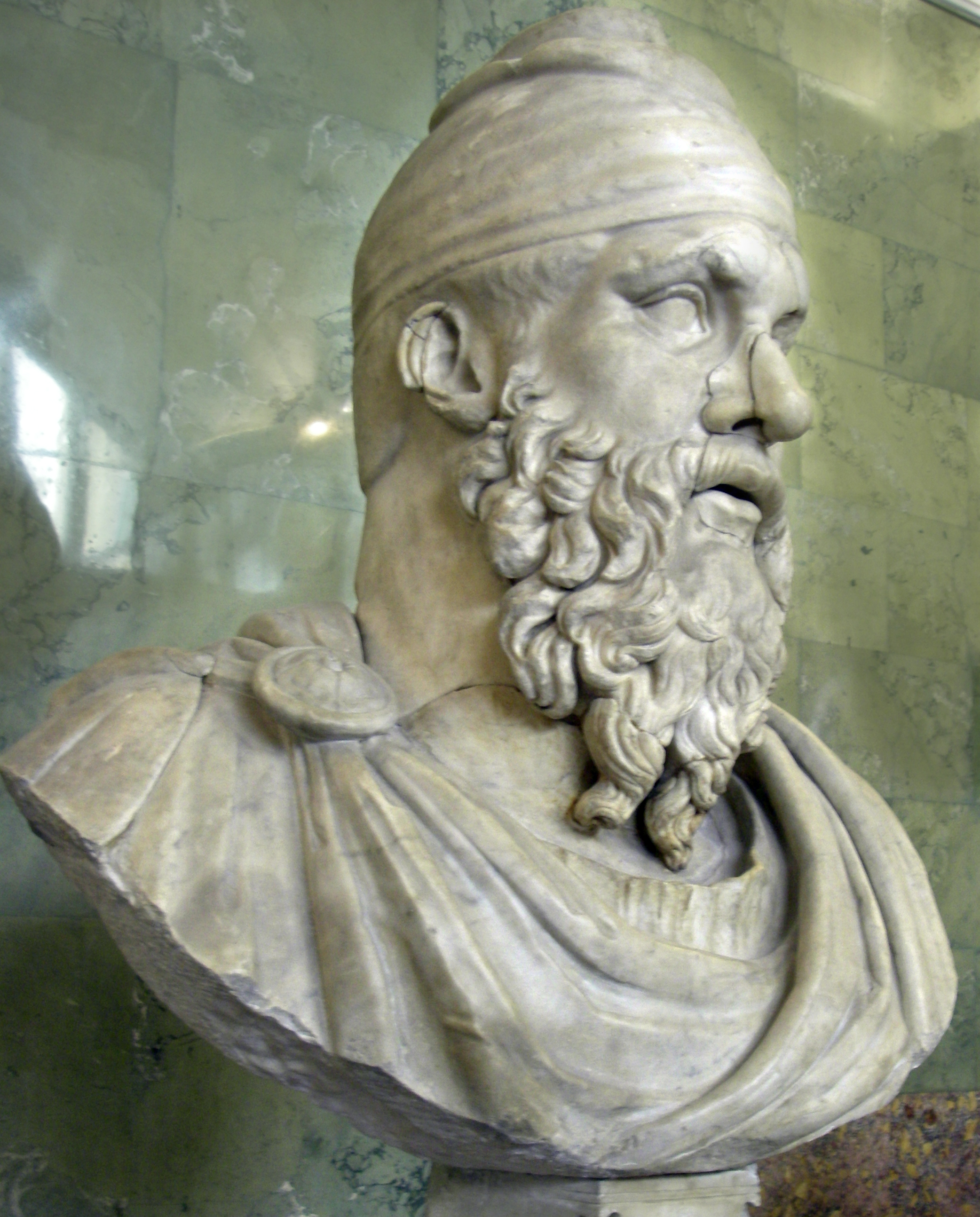
Dacian king Burebista

- 89 BC: Mithridates VI of Pontus's invasion of Cappadocia leads to the First Mithridatic War with the Roman Republic.
- 89 BC: Valagamba of Anuradhapura gains control of all of Sri Lanka
- 88 BC: 80,000 Roman civilians killed in the Asiatic Vespers in Asia Minor
- 87 BC: Emperor Wu of Han dies and is succeeded by his eight-year-old son Zhao, with Jin Midi, Shangguang Jie and Huo Guang as regents.
- 88 BC: Sulla becomes the first Roman general in history to march on Rome
- 87 BC: Civil war between the Roman consuls Cornelius Cinna and Octavius
- 86 BC: Siege of Athens ends with Roman conquest of Athens.
- 86 BC: the death of the regent of China Jin Midi unleashes the rivalry of his co-regents Shangguang Jie and Huo Guang.
- 85 BC: Sulla defeats the forces of Mithridates VI in Greece at the Battle of Orchomenus
- 85 BC: Aretas III of the Nabataeans conquers Damascus.
- 83 BC: Sulla makes peace with Mithridates VI and marches on Rome.
- 83-81 BC: Lucius Licinius Murena wages the Second Mithridatic War.
- 82 BC: Sertorius flees from Sulla to North Africa via Hispania
- 82 BC: The Dacian king Burebista comes to power and unites the Dacian tribes
- c.83 BC: Tigranes of Armenia takes control of Syria after the implosion of the Seleucid dynasty.
- 81 BC: Sulla is appointed dictator of the Roman state, and brings about major reforms.
- 80 BC: Sertorius invades Hispania and sets up his own regime, beginning the Sertorian War (80-72).
- 80 BC: conflict between the regents Shangguang Jie and Huo Guang results in the destruction of the Shangguang clan and Huo Guang becoming the de facto ruler of China.
- c.80 BC: Maues, King of the Sakas, conquers Gandhara and Taxila.

=== 70s BC ===
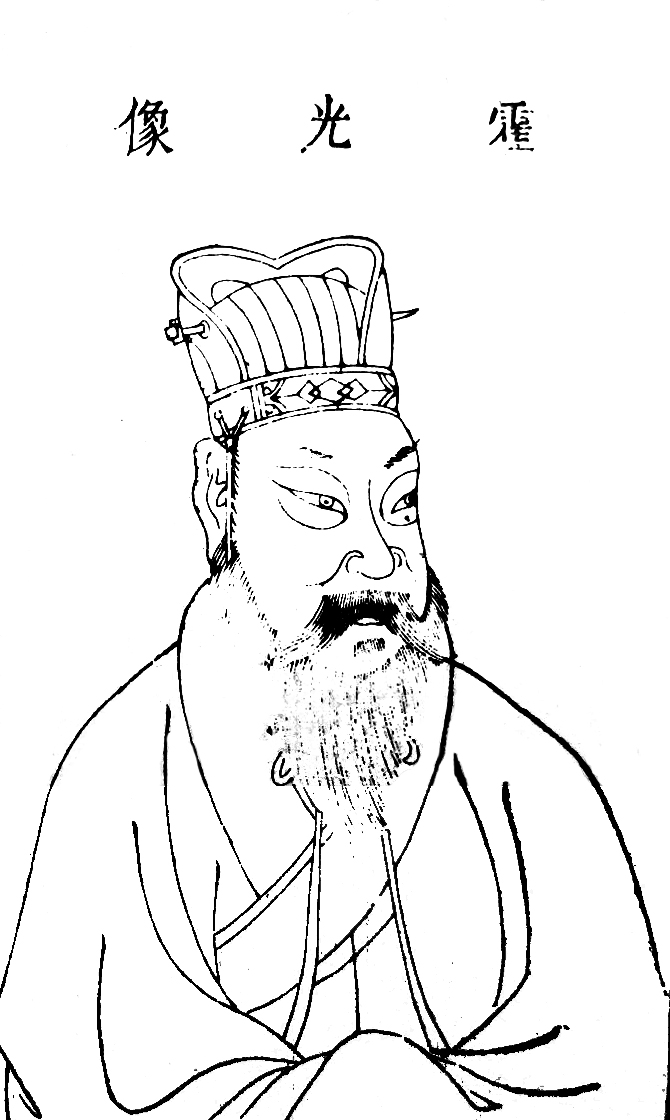
Huo Guang

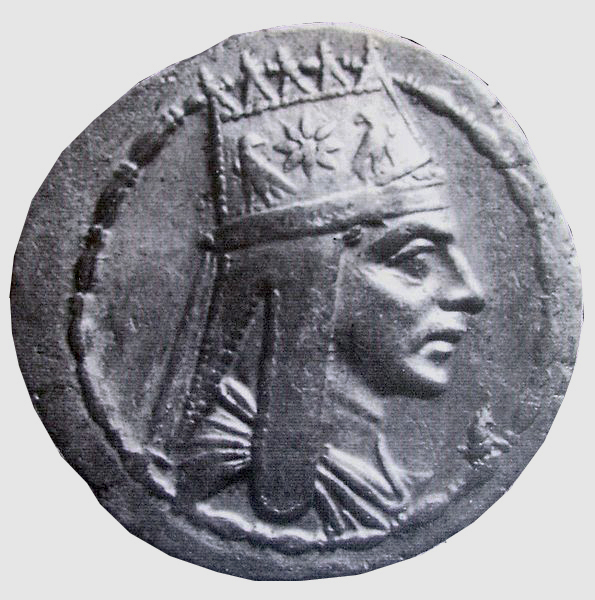
Tigranes the Great

- 77 BC: Fu Jiezi assassinated the king of Loulan on behalf of the Han dynasty.
- c.75 BC: Kanva dynasty replaces the Shunga dynasty in Magadha.
- 74 BC: Mithridates VI of Pontus disputes Nicomedes IV of Bithynia's bequest of his kingdom to the Roman Republic, beginning the Third Mithridatic War.
- 74 BC: Emperor Zhao of Han dies and is succeeded by the unsuitable Prince He of Changyi and then by Xuan. Huo Guang continues to be de facto ruler of China.
- 73 BC: a slave rebellion led by the escaped gladiator Spartacus leads to the Third Servile War.
- 73-72 BC: Lucullus defeats Mithridates at Tenedos, Cyzicus, and the Rhyndacus and he flees east to Armenia
- 71 BC: Pompey the Great ends the Sertorian War (restoring Roman control of Hispania) and the Third Servile War (restoring Roman control of southern Italy).
- 71 BC: Wusun and China attack the Xiongnu.

=== 60s BC ===
- 69 BC: Lucullus invades Armenia (Battle of Tigranocerta) and reestablishes the Seleucids in Syria.
- 68 BC: Pompey replaces Lucullus as leader of the Roman forces in the Third Mithridatic War.
- 68 BC: Huo Guang dies and Emperor Xuan of Han assumes full power. The Huo clan is eliminated over the following two years.
- 67 BC: Pompey is given a three-year extraordinary command against the pirates plaguing the Mediterranean and defeats them in forty days.
- 66 BC: Pompey drives Mithridates VI out of Asia Minor (Battle of the Lycus).
- 66 BC: Aristobulus II seizes power from John Hyrcanus II in Judea.
- 63 BC: Mithridates VI commits suicide, ending the Third Mithridatic War.
- 63 BC: Cicero denounces and defeats the Catilinarian conspiracy.
- 63 BC: Pompey captures Jerusalem, and establishes Roman annexation of Judea as a client kingdom. He also permanently abolishes Seleucid Syria. Aristobulus II of Judea removed from power & John Hyrcanus II restored as Roman vassal.
- 62 BC: Nabataean kingdom becomes a Roman vassal.
- 61 BC: Orgetorix and the Helvetii's attempt to migrate into southwestern France leads Julius Caesar to take military action, beginning the Gallic Wars
- 60 BC: Julius Caesar, Pompey, and Crassus form the First Triumvirate
- c. 60 BC: the Sakas conquer Mathura.

=== 50s BC ===
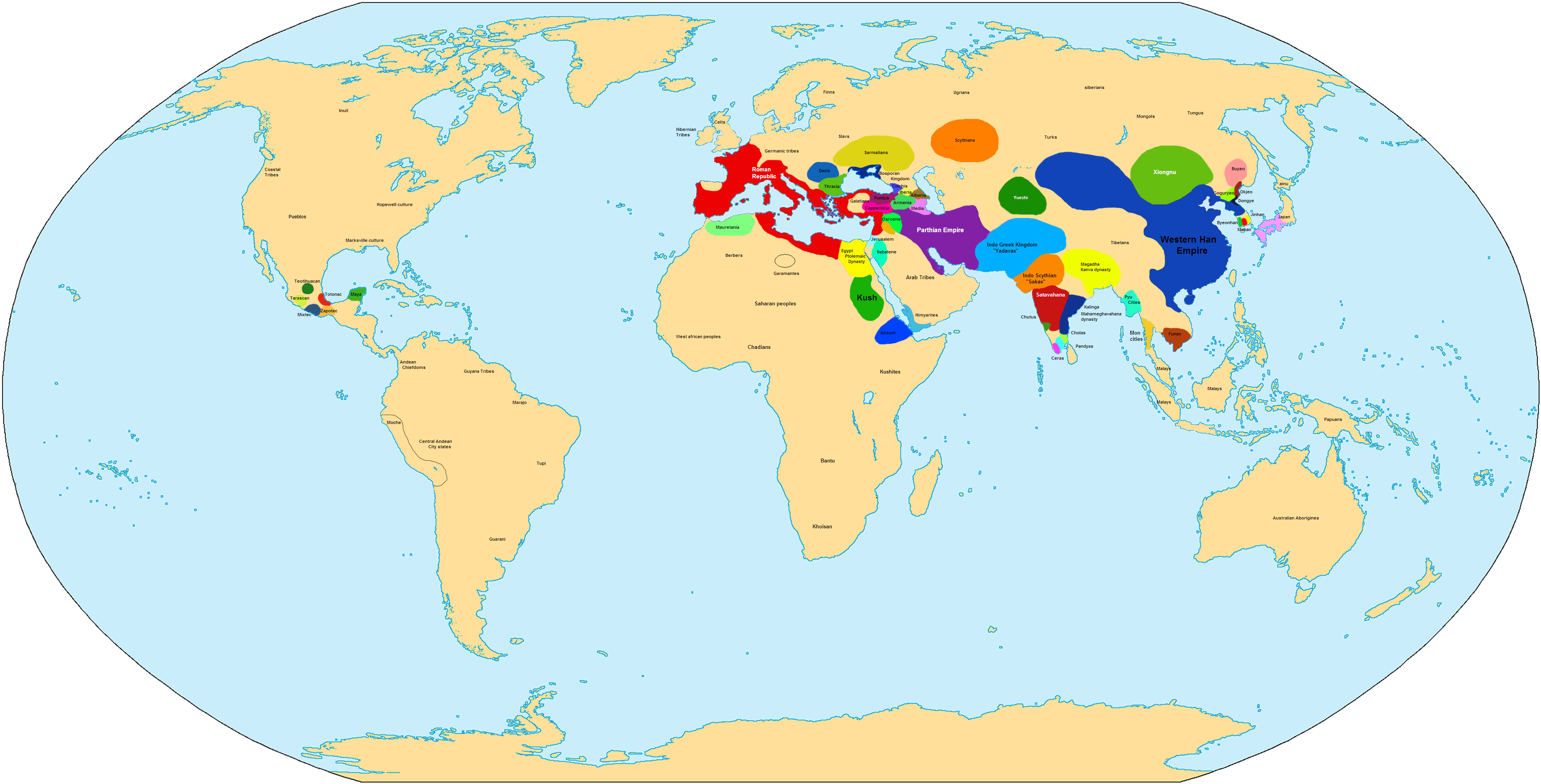
Map of the world in 50 BC

- 58 BC: Battle of Bibracte - Julius Caesar conquers the Helvetii
- 58 BC: Germans invade Gaul and are defeated by Julius Caesar at Battle of Vosges (58 BC).
- 58 BC: Clodius becomes the leading figure in Roman urban politics. Cicero goes into exile.
- 58 BC: Huhanye rebels against his distant cousin Woyanqudi Chanyu of the Xiongyu, beginning the Xiongnu civil war.
- 57 BC: Julius Caesar invades and defeats the Belgae at the Battle of the Sabis.
- 57 BC: Cicero recalled from exile through the machinations of Milo and his mob.
- 57 BC: Silla is founded in southeastern Korea (traditional date according to Samguk Sagi, a 12th-century historical document).
- 56 BC: Vikramaditya defeats the Sakas at Ujjain and founds the Vikram Samvat calendar era.
- 55-54 BC: Caesar's invasions of Britain.
- 54-53 BC: Ambiorix's revolt against Julius Caesar in Gaul.
- 53 BC: the Parthians defeat the Romans under Crassus in the Battle of Carrhae, ending the First Triumvirate.
- 53 BC: Clodius dies during mob violence in Rome. His followers burn down the Senate house.
- 53 BC: Huhanye Chanyu of the Xiongnu become a Chinese vassal.
- 52 BC: Pompey joins the Optimates and becomes sole Consul in Rome.
- 52 BC: Vercingetorix's revolt in Gaul (Battle of Gergovia, Battle of Alesia).
- 51 BC: Siege of Uxellodunum marks the end of the Gallic Wars and the final Roman conquest of Gaul.
- Mid 1st century BC – East torana of the Great Stupa at Sanchi, is made. Early Andhra period. According to an inscription, it is sculpted by ivory carvers from the nearby town of Vidisha.

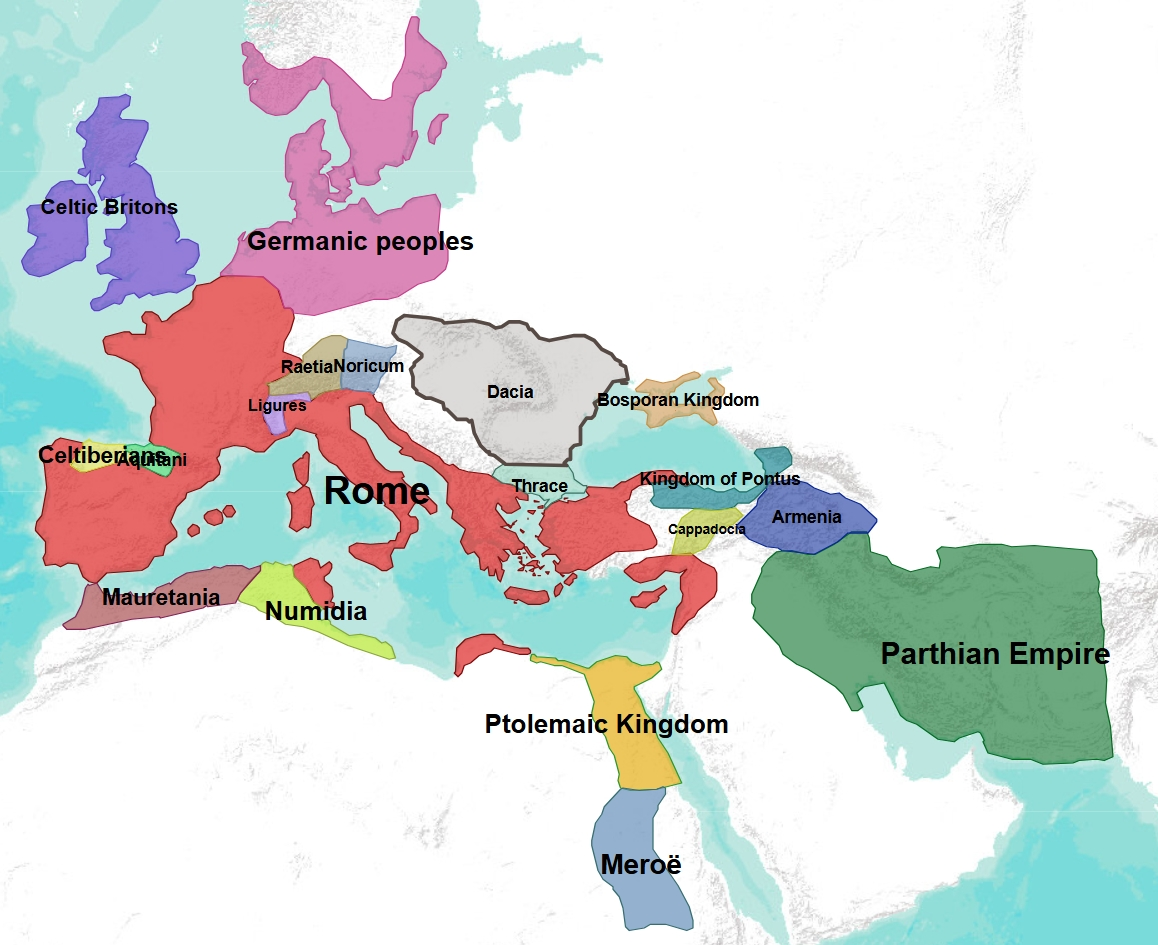
Map of Europe, North Africa and Middle East around 50-40 BC

=== 40s BC ===
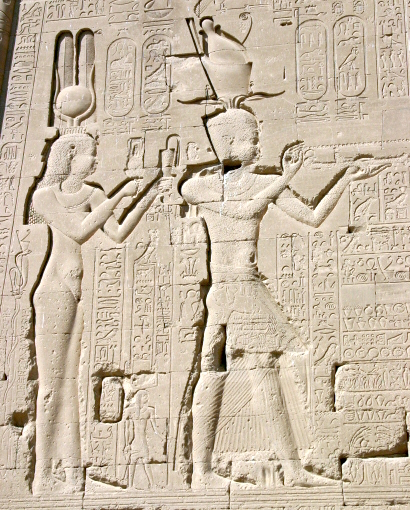
Cleopatra VII and her son Caesarion at the Temple of Dendera

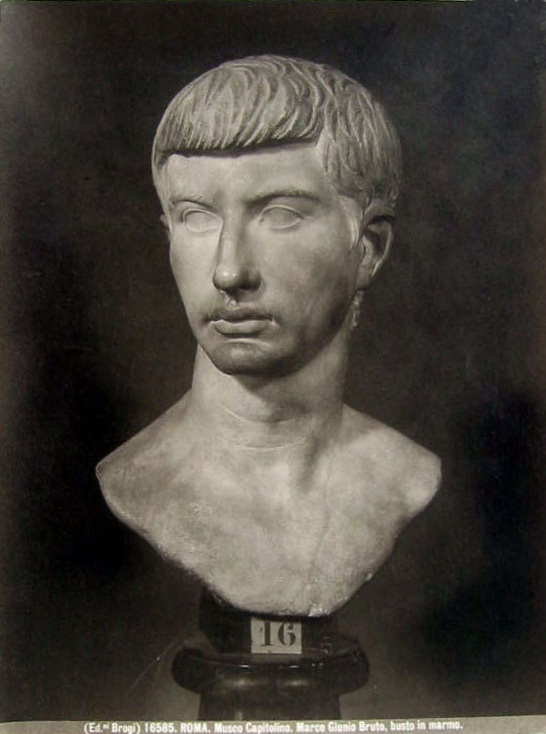
Marcus Junius Brutus

- 49 BC: Julius Caesar crosses the Rubicon river and takes the city of Rome, beginning Caesar's Civil War.
- 48 BC: Ptolemy XIII deposes his co-regent Cleopatra, beginning the Ptolemaic civil war in Egypt
- 48 BC: Emperor Xuan of Han dies and is succeeded by his son Yuan. Wang Zhengjun is made Empress, as a result of which her clan would eventually topple the Han dynasty.
- 48 BC: Julius Caesar decisively defeats Pompey at the Battle of Pharsalus.
- 47 BC: Cleopatra restored to the Ptolemaic throne after the Battle of the Nile (47 BC)
- 47 BC: year of six kings in Anuradhapura in Sri Lanka
- 46 BC: Julius Caesar takes control of Africa at the Battle of Thapsus.
- 46 BC: China abandons control of Hainan as a cost-cutting measure.
- 45 BC: Julius Caesar wins the Battle of Munda, regaining control of Hispania and ending the Roman Civil War.
- 44 BC: Julius Caesar named Dictator perpetuo
- 44 BC: Julius Caesar re-founds Carthage and Corinth as Roman colonies.
- 44 BC: Assassination of Julius Caesar on the Ides of March.
- 44 BC: Burebista death, Dacian empire collapses into four then five smaller kingdoms.
- 43 BC: Octavian, Mark Antony, and Lepidus form the Second Triumvirate and take control of Rome.
- 42 BC: Second Triumvirate defeats Julius Caesar's assassins at the Battle of Philippi
- 41-40 BC: Lucius Antonius and Octavian fight the Perusine War
- 40 BC: Pacorus I conquers Roman Syria.

=== 30s BC ===
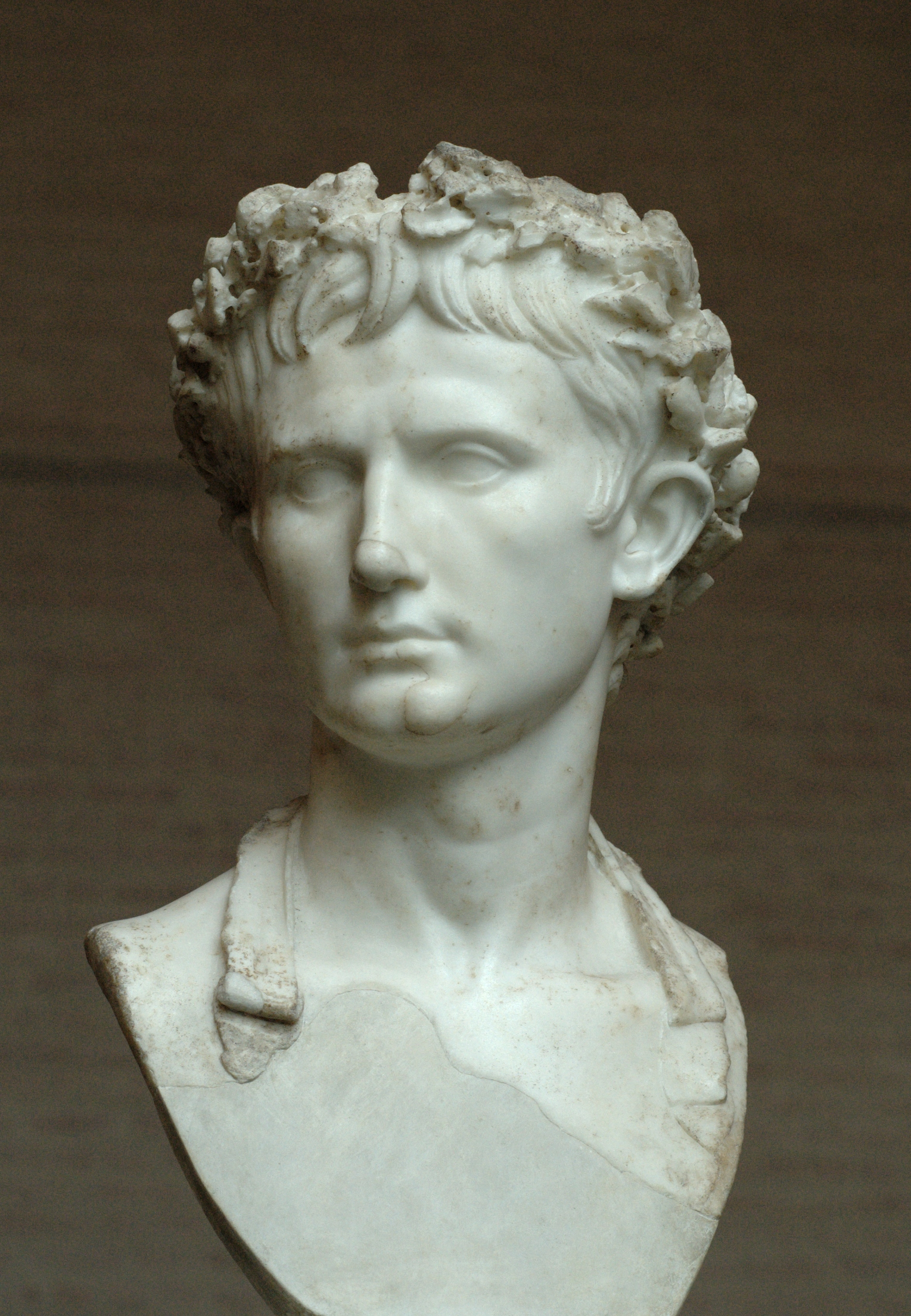
Caesar Augustus

- 38 BC: Ventidius defeats the Parthians at the Battle of Mount Gindarus, reclaiming Roman Syria.
- 38 BC: Octavian divorces Scribonia and marries Livia Drusilla on January 17th.
- 37 BC: Herod the Great becomes king of Judea.
- 37 BC: Mark Antony invades Parthia.
- 37 BC: Goguryeo is founded in southern Manchuria (traditional date according to Samguk Sagi).
- 36 BC: Battle of Naulochus: Second Triumvirate gains control of Sicily from the rebel Sextus Pompey.
- 36 BC: Battle of Zhizhi: Gan Yanshou and Chen Tang launch an unauthorised expedition which prevents the Xiongnu from extending their power into Central Asia.
- 34 BC: Cleopatra and Mark Antony perform the Donations of Alexandria.
- 33 BC: Emperor Yuan of Han dies and is succeeded by his son Cheng. Empress Wang Zhengjun becomes Empress Dowager and her brother is placed in command of the armed forces and administration.
- 32 BC: disagreements between Octavian and Mark Antony cause the outbreak of the Final War of the Roman Republic.
- 31 BC: Battle of Actium: Octavian defeats troops under Mark Antony and Cleopatra, becoming de facto ruler of the Roman empire.
- 30 BC: Octavian annexes Egypt.
- c.30 BC: Satavahana dynasty replaces the Kanva dynasty in Magadha.

=== 20s BC ===
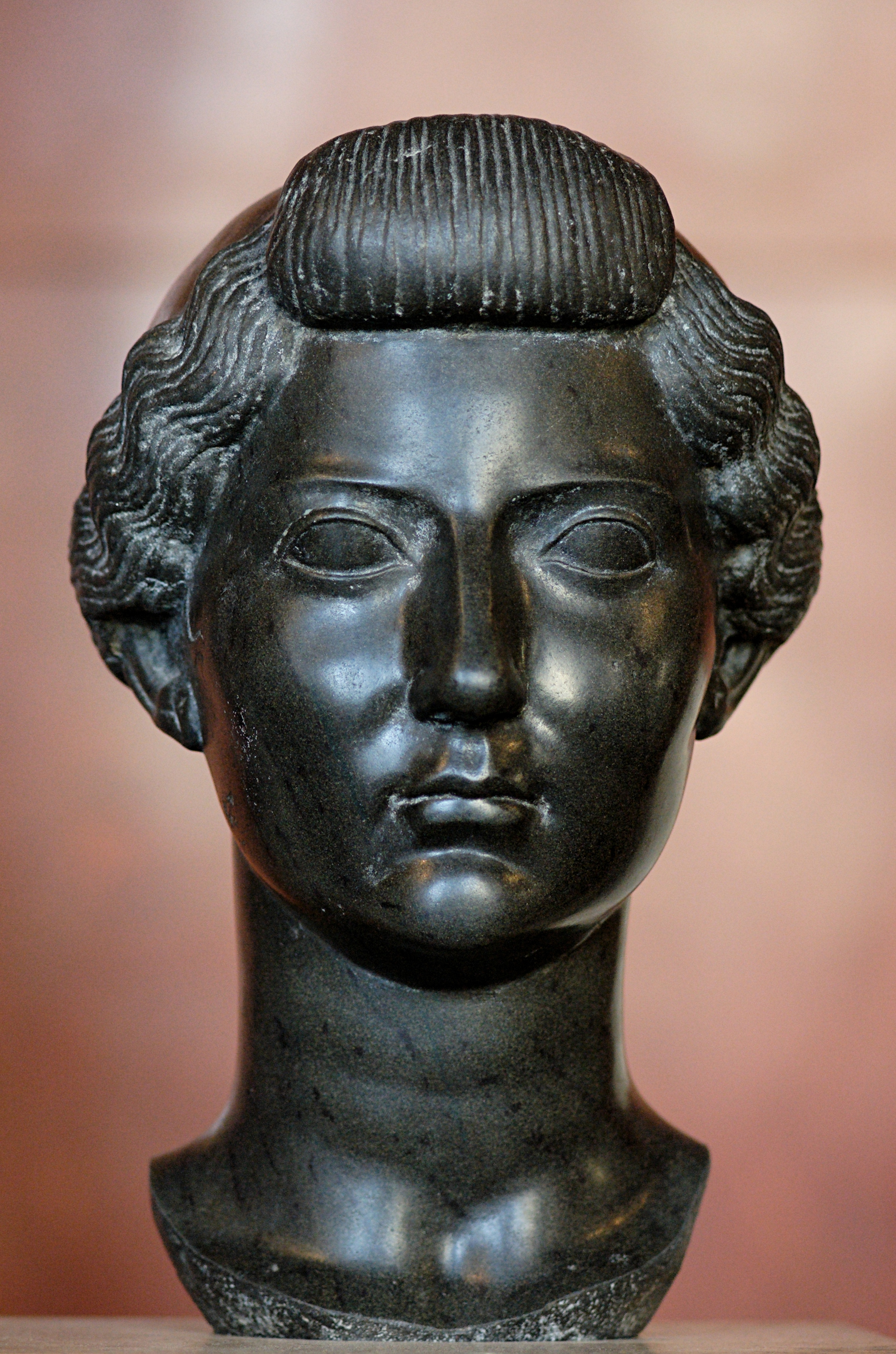
Livia Drusilla

- 27 BC: the Roman Senate votes Octavian the title of Augustus. Augustus eventually assumes all authority formerly held by the Roman senate becoming the first emperor. This is traditionally taken as the end of the Roman Republic and the beginning of the Principate (27 BC-AD 235).
- 25 BC: Galatia annexed by Rome after the death of Amyntas of Galatia.
- Second half of 1st century BC – Chaitya hall at Karli, India, Maharashtra, is made. Early Andhra period.

=== 10s BC ===
- 19 BC: conclusion of major fighting in the Cantabrian Wars marks the end of the Roman conquest of Hispania
- 18 BC: Baekje is founded in mid-western Korea (traditional date according to Samguk Sagi).
- 16-13 BC: Augustus establishes the Rhine limes.
- Maison Carrée and Pont du Gard built.

=== 0s BC ===
- 9 BC: Pannonia annexed to the Roman empire by the future emperor Tiberius
- 8 BC: Wang Mang becomes head of the Chinese armed forces and administration.
- 7 BC: Emperor Cheng of Han dies and is succeeded by his nephew Ai. Empress Dowager Wang Zhengjun becomes Grand Empress Dowager and the Emperor's grandmother Consort Fu becomes Empress Dowager. Wang Mang resigns as head of the armed forces and administration. The reign is dominated by the destabilising intrigues of the Wang and Fu clans.
- c. 6 BC – 4 BC: birth of Jesus of Nazareth (see Chronology of Jesus' birth and death, Anno Domini, and Common Era for further details).
- 4 BC: Judea annexed to the Roman province of Syria after the death of King Herod.
- 2 BC: Emperor Ai of Han appoints his unpopular homosexual lover Dong Xian as head of armed forces and administration.
- 1 BC: Emperor Ai of Han dies and is succeeded by his eight year old cousin Ping. Wang Mang is appointed regent and begins wide-ranging reforms.

== Significant people ==
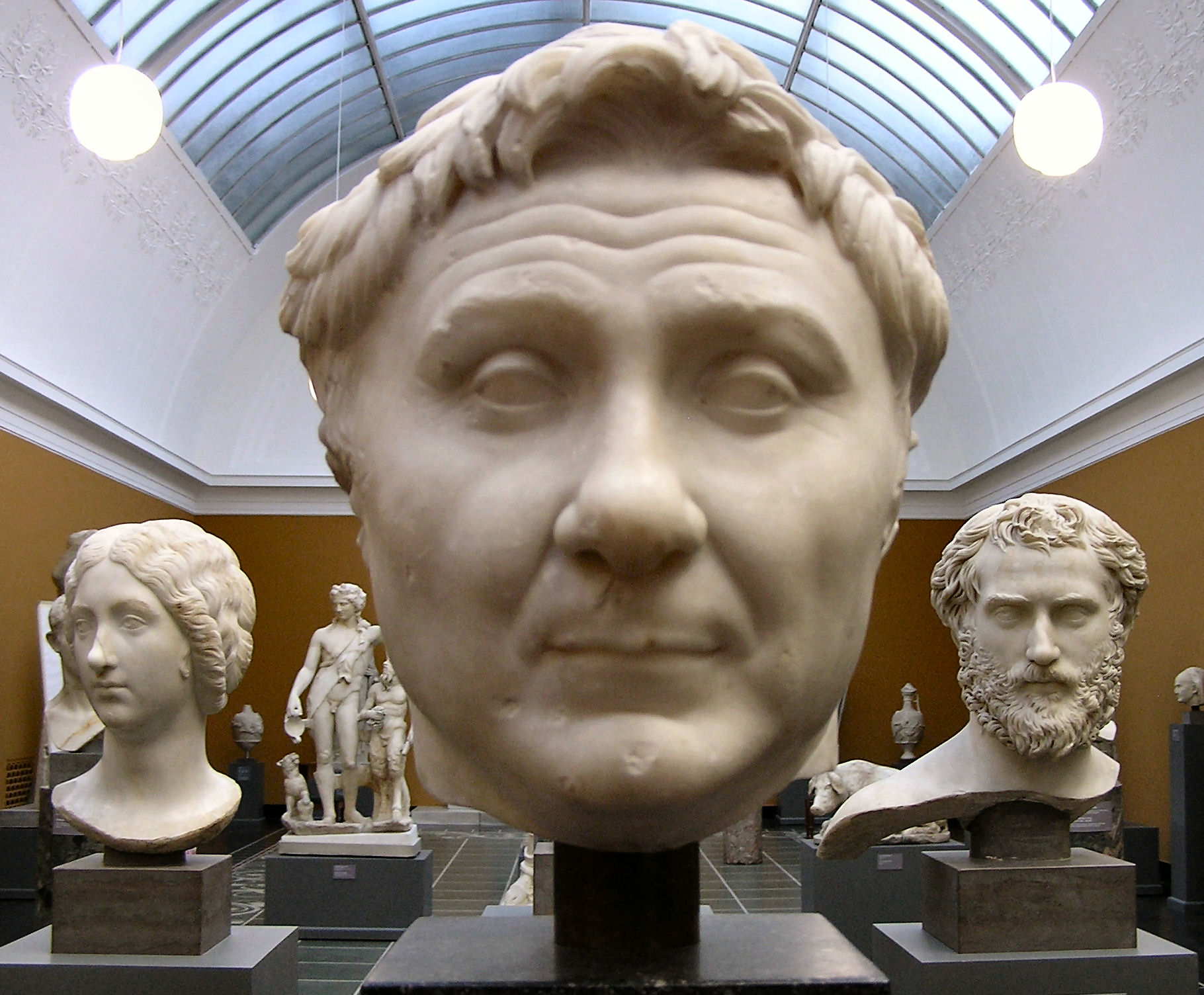
Pompey the Great

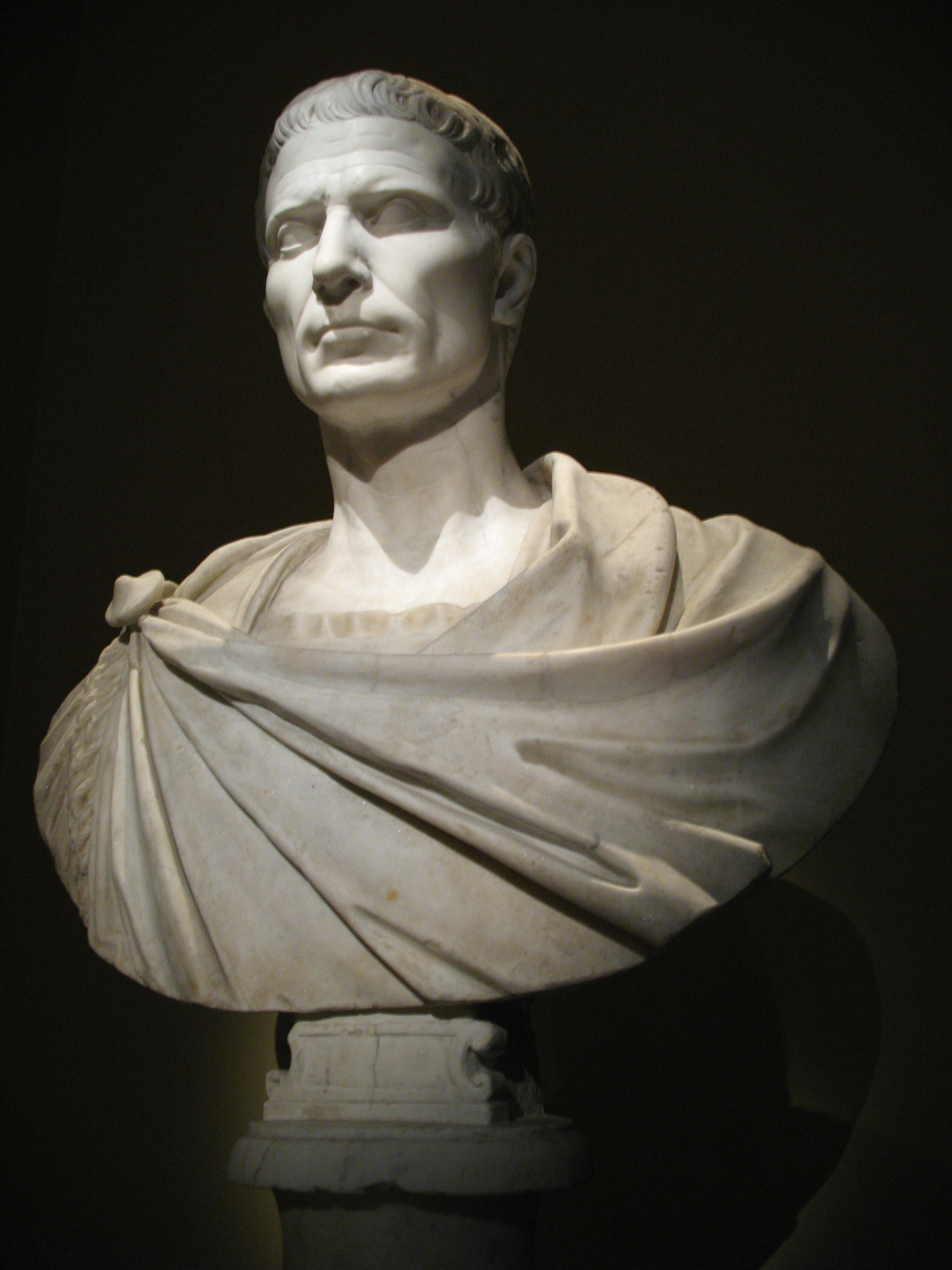
Julius Caesar

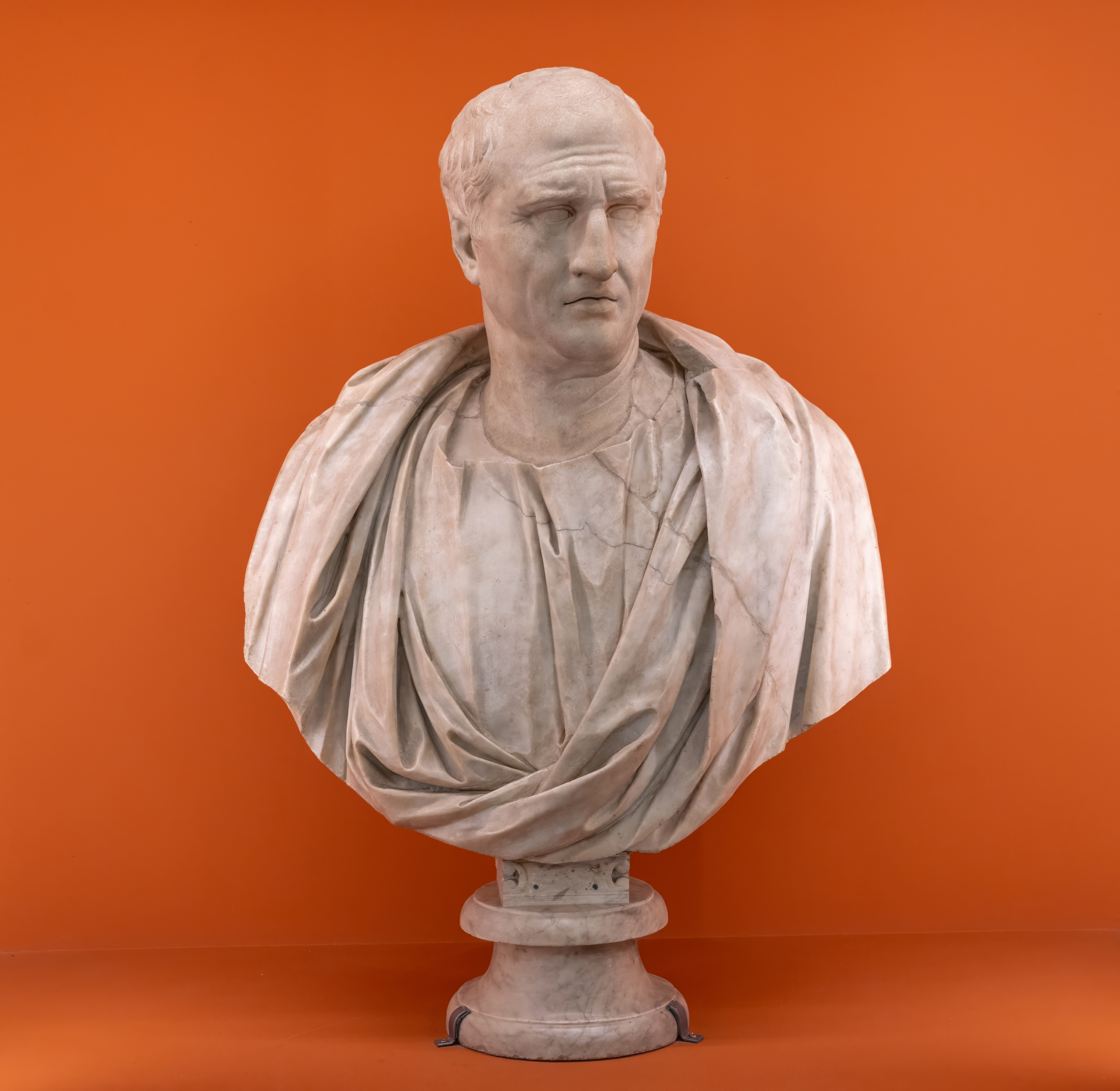
Cicero

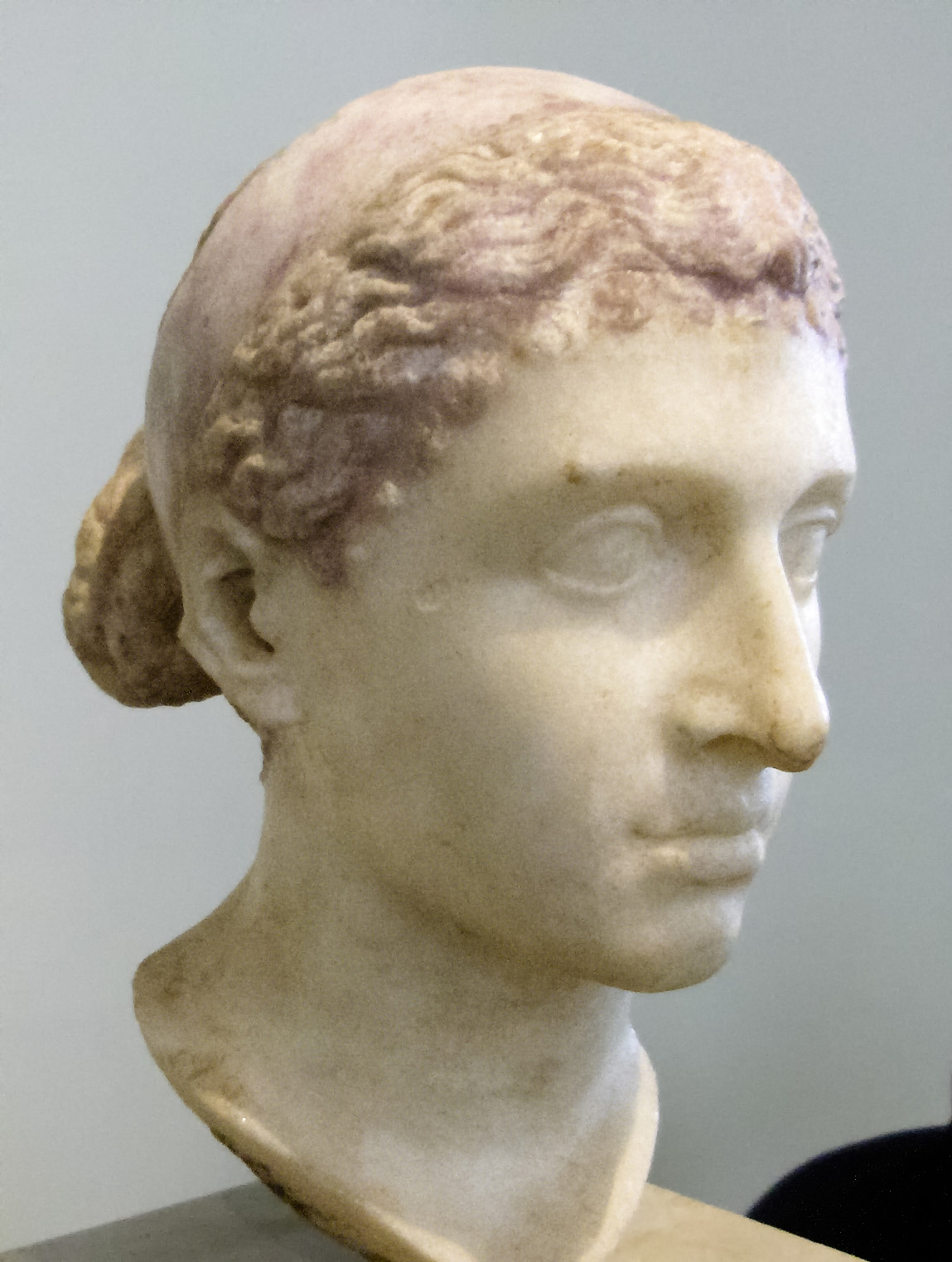
Cleopatra

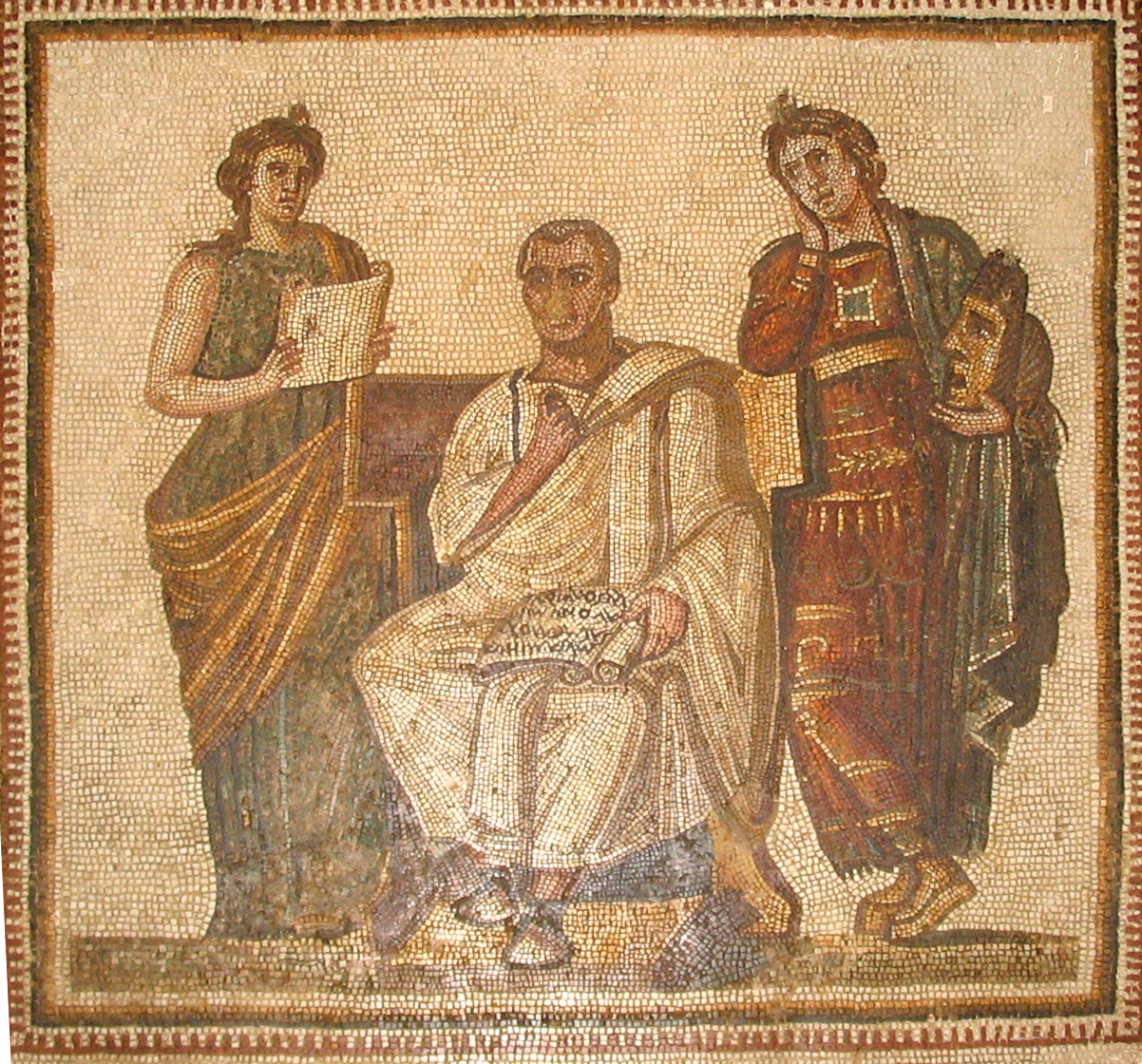
Virgil

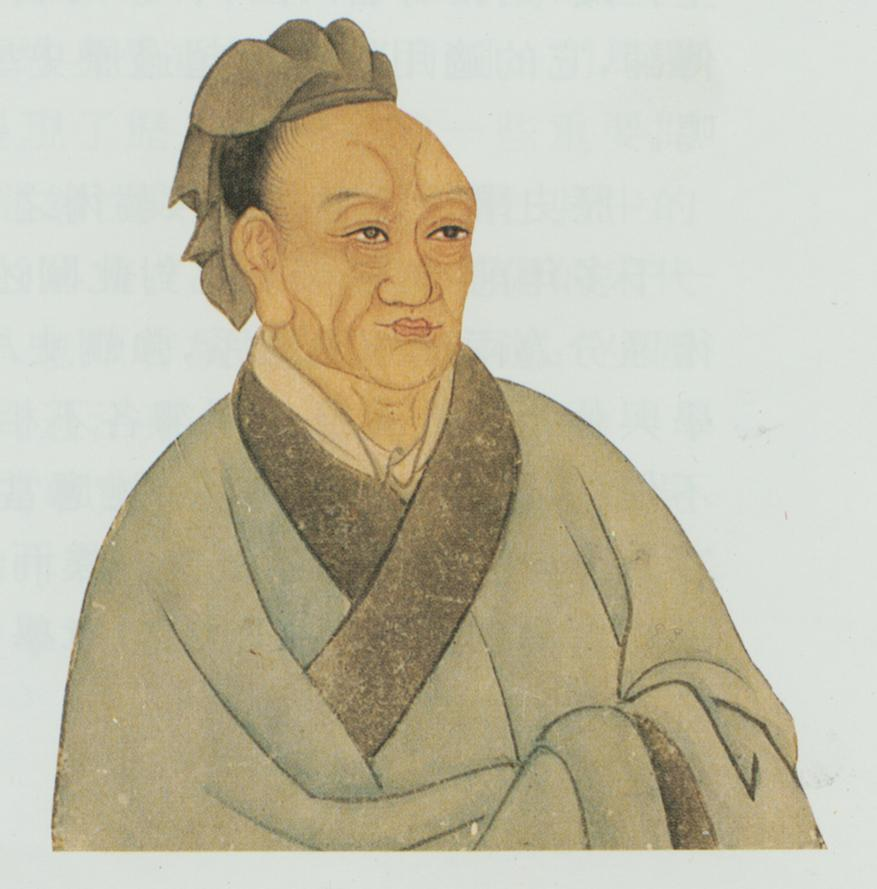
Sima Qian

=== Politics (and relatives of political figures) ===
- Marcus Aemilius Lepidus, Roman politician
- Agrippa, Roman statesman and general
- Ambiorix, prince of the Eburones, Gallic tribal chief
- Mark Antony, Roman general and politician
- Ariovistus, leader of the Suebi, Germanic tribal chief
- Augustus, Roman Emperor
- Brutus, Roman politician
- Burebista, king of Dacia
- Cassivellaunus, Celtic Briton tribal chief
- Catiline, attempted to overthrow Roman Republic
- Cato the Younger, Roman politician
- Cleopatra VII of Egypt, Ruler of Egypt
- Publius Clodius Pulcher, Roman politician, demagogue
- Crassus, Roman general and politician
- Herod the Great, king of Judea
- Huo Guang, Chinese politician
- Juba II, last king of Numidia
- Julia the Elder, Roman noblewoman, wife of Agrippa and Tiberius
- Julius Caesar, Roman general and statesman
- Livia, Empress of Rome, mother of Tiberius
- Lucullus, Roman general and politician
- Maecenas, Roman politician and famous philanthropist
- Gaius Marius, Roman general and statesman
- Nalankilli, king of the early Chola dynasty in South India
- Octavia the Younger, Roman noblewoman, sister of Augustus and wife of Mark Antony.
- Pompey, Roman general and politician
- Sextus Pompey, Roman general and son of Pompey
- Ptolemy XIII of Egypt, pharaoh of Egypt
- Sertorius, Roman statesman and general
- Sulla, Roman general and statesman
- Tigranes the Great, king of Armenia
- Vercingetorix, Gallic king and chieftain
- Xuan of Han, Chinese emperor

=== Religion ===
- Hillel the Elder, Jewish rabbi
- Jesus of Nazareth, The Son of God in various beliefs
- John the Baptist, Jewish prophet in Christianity and Islam
- Joseph, according to the New Testament the foster father of Jesus.
- Mary, according to the New Testament and the Quran the mother of Jesus.
- Zarmanochegas, Indian gymnosophist

=== Literature, science, and philosophy ===
- Aemilius Macer, Roman didactic poet
- Alfenus Varus, Roman jurist
- Afranius, Roman dramatist
- Antiochus of Ascalon, Syrian Greek philosopher
- Antipater of Thessalonica, Greek poet
- Apollonius of Citium, Cypriot Greek doctor
- Asinius Pollio, Roman poet and historian
- Asclepiodotus, Greek philosopher and writer on tactics
- Athenaeus Mechanicus, Greek writer on siege weapons
- Consort Ban, Chinese poet
- Calvus, Roman poet and orator
- Catullus, Roman poet
- Cicero, Roman writer, philosopher and politician
- Cornelius Gallus, Roman poet and politician
- Cornelius Nepos, Roman biographer
- Crinagoras of Mytilene, Greek poet
- Didymus Chalcenterus, Alexandrian Greek grammarian
- Diodorus Siculus, Sicilian Greek historian
- Dionysius of Halicarnassus, Greek historian and grammarian
- Elephantis, Greek poet and medical writer
- Geminus, Rhodian Greek astronomer and mathematician
- Helvius Cinna, Roman poet
- Horace, Roman poet
- Huan Tan, Chinese poet, philosopher and politician
- Jing Fang, Chinese mathematician and music theorist
- Marcus Antistius Labeo, Roman jurist
- Livy, Roman historian
- Liu Xiang, Chinese poet and librarian
- Liu Xin, Chinese astronomer, mathematician, and librarian
- Lucretius, Roman poet and philosopher
- Meleager of Gadara, Syrian Greek poet and anthologist
- Nigidius Figulus, Roman philosopher and polymath
- Ovid, Roman poet
- Parmenion, Greek poet
- Parthenius of Nicaea, Bithynian Greek poet and grammarian
- Philodemus, Syrian Greek poet and philosopher
- Lucius Pomponius, Roman dramatist
- Pompeius Trogus, Roman historian
- Marcus Porcius Latro, Roman orator
- Posidonius, Syrian Greek philosopher, geographer, and polymath
- Propertius, Roman poet
- Rutilius Lupus, Roman rhetorician
- Publilius Syrus, Syrian/Roman poet and dramatist
- Sallust, Roman historian, politician
- Sima Qian, Chinese historian, father of Chinese historiography
- Sisenna, Roman historian
- Strabo, Pontian Greek geographer and historian
- Themison of Laodicea, Syrian Greek doctor, founder of Methodic school of medicine
- Tibullus, Roman poet
- Tryphon, Alexandrian Greek grammarian
- Valerius Antias, Roman historian
- Varro, Roman polymath
- Verrius Flaccus, Roman grammarian
- Virgil, Roman poet
- Vitruvius, Roman writer, architect and engineer
- Wang Bao, Chinese poet
- Yang Xiong, Chinese poet and philosopher
- Sangam literature, ancient Tamil literary works.

=== Others ===
- Crixus, Gallic gladiator and rebel leader
- Jin Midi, Chinese official
- Spartacus, gladiator and insurgent leader of the Third Servile War

== Inventions, discoveries, introductions ==
- The Antikythera mechanism is made.
- The Chinese Ji Jiu Pian dictionary published in 40 BC during the Han dynasty is the earliest known reference to the hydraulic-powered trip hammer device.
- 36 BC: Maya numeral for Zero was written in Chiapa; it is the oldest zero in The Americas.

== Sovereign states ==
See: List of sovereign states in the 1st century BC.
