= 78 BC =

78 BC in various calendars
- Gregorian calendar: 78 BC; LXXVIII BC
- Ab urbe condita: 676
- Ancient Egypt era: XXXIII dynasty, 246
- Pharaoh: Ptolemy XII Auletes, 3
- Ancient Greek Olympiad (summer): 175th Olympiad, year 3
- Assyrian calendar: 4673
- Balinese saka calendar: N/A
- Bengali calendar: −671 – −670
- Berber calendar: 873
- Buddhist calendar: 467
- Burmese calendar: −715
- Byzantine calendar: 5431–5432
- Chinese calendar: 壬寅年 (Water Tiger); 2620 or 2413 — to — 癸卯年 (Water Rabbit); 2621 or 2414
- Coptic calendar: −361 – −360
- Discordian calendar: 1089
- Ethiopian calendar: −85 – −84
- Hebrew calendar: 3683–3684
- Hindu calendars
- Vikram Samvat: −21 – −20
- Shaka Samvat: N/A
- Kali Yuga: 3023–3024
- Holocene calendar: 9923
- Iranian calendar: 699 BP – 698 BP
- Islamic calendar: 720 BH – 719 BH
- Javanese calendar: N/A
- Julian calendar: N/A
- Korean calendar: 2256
- Minguo calendar: 1989 before ROC 民前1989年
- Nanakshahi calendar: −1545
- Seleucid era: 234/235 AG
- Thai solar calendar: 465–466
- Tibetan calendar: ཆུ་ཕོ་སྟག་ལོ་ (male Water-Tiger); 49 or −332 or −1104 — to — ཆུ་མོ་ཡོས་ལོ་ (female Water-Hare); 50 or −331 or −1103

Year 78 BC was a year of the pre-Julian Roman calendar. At the time it was known as the Year of the Consulship of Lepidus and Catulus. Later and less frequently, it was known as the year 676 AUC). The denomination 78 BC for this year has been used since the early medieval period, when the Anno Domini calendar era became the prevalent method in Europe for naming years.

== Events ==
=== By place ===
==== Roman Republic ====
- In Rome, Marcus Aemilius Lepidus becomes consul. He attempts to undermine the Sullan reforms, quarrels with his consular colleague, is sent to govern Transalpine Gaul, and initiates a rebellion against the Senate with his army there.
- The Senate sends Publius Servilius Vatia to Cilicia as governor, where he fights a successful campaign against the Piracy in southern Anatolia (Lycia, Pamphylia and Isauria), he is thereafter known by the agnomen Isauricus.
- The Tabularium is built in the Forum.
- The Third Dalmatian war begins.
- Julius Caesar returns to Rome after about two years of service in the army

== Births ==
- Jing Fang, Chinese mathematician and music theorist (d. 37 BC)

== Deaths ==
- Lucius Cornelius Sulla, Roman general and statesman (b. 138 BC)
