= 53 BC =

53 BC in various calendars
- Gregorian calendar: 53 BC; LIII BC
- Ab urbe condita: 701
- Ancient Egypt era: XXXIII dynasty, 271
- Pharaoh: Ptolemy XII Auletes, 28
- Ancient Greek Olympiad (summer): 181st Olympiad, year 4
- Assyrian calendar: 4698
- Balinese saka calendar: N/A
- Bengali calendar: −646 – −645
- Berber calendar: 898
- Buddhist calendar: 492
- Burmese calendar: −690
- Byzantine calendar: 5456–5457
- Chinese calendar: 丁卯年 (Fire Rabbit); 2645 or 2438 — to — 戊辰年 (Earth Dragon); 2646 or 2439
- Coptic calendar: −336 – −335
- Discordian calendar: 1114
- Ethiopian calendar: −60 – −59
- Hebrew calendar: 3708–3709
- Hindu calendars
- Vikram Samvat: 4–5
- Shaka Samvat: N/A
- Kali Yuga: 3048–3049
- Holocene calendar: 9948
- Iranian calendar: 674 BP – 673 BP
- Islamic calendar: 695 BH – 694 BH
- Javanese calendar: N/A
- Julian calendar: N/A
- Korean calendar: 2281
- Minguo calendar: 1964 before ROC 民前1964年
- Nanakshahi calendar: −1520
- Seleucid era: 259/260 AG
- Thai solar calendar: 490–491
- Tibetan calendar: མེ་མོ་ཡོས་ལོ་ (female Fire-Hare); 74 or −307 or −1079 — to — ས་ཕོ་འབྲུག་ལོ་ (male Earth-Dragon); 75 or −306 or −1078

Year 53 BC was a year of the pre-Julian Roman calendar. At the time, it was known as the Year of the Consulship of Messalla and Calvinus (or, less frequently, year 701 Ab urbe condita). The denomination 53 BC for this year has been used since the early medieval period, when the Anno Domini calendar era became the prevalent method in Europe for naming years.

== Events ==
=== By place ===
==== Parthian Empire ====
- The Parthian Empire achieved a decisive victory against Rome at the Battle of Carrhae, where General Surena defeated and killed Roman triumvir Marcus Licinius Crassus. According to some historical interpretations, the Mahestan (Parthian noble council) supported preparations for the defense of the empire and advised the king during the military mobilization.

==== Roman Republic ====
- Consuls: Marcus Valerius Messalla and Gnaeus Domitius Calvinus.
- Parthian War:
  - Crassus sacks the Temple of Hierapolis and the Temple in Jerusalem on his way to engage the Parthians.
  - May 6 – Battle of Carrhae: Romans defeated, and Crassus killed, by Parthians led by General Surena.
- Gallic War:
  - Julius Caesar suppresses a revolt led by Ambiorix near Sabis (Northern Gaul).
  - At Cenabum (modern Orléans) Roman merchants are massacred by the Carnutes.
  - Vercingetorix, an Arverni chieftain, leads a revolt against Caesar in Central Gaul.
  - Winter – Caesar enrolls non-citizen soldiers in Gallia Transalpina, genesis of Legio V Alaudae. He increases his army to ten legions.

==== Armenia ====
- Artavasdes II becomes king of Armenia.

== Births ==
- Aristobulus III, high priest of Jerusalem (d. 36 BC)
- Yang Xiong, Chinese politician and philosopher (d. AD 18)

== Deaths ==
- May 6 (executed after the Battle of Carrhae)
  - Marcus Licinius Crassus, Roman politician and general
  - Publius Licinius Crassus, son of Marcus Licinius Crassus
- Abgar II, Arab king of Edessa (modern Turkey)
- Gaius Scribonius Curio, Roman statesman and orator
