= 52 BC =

52 BC in various calendars
- Gregorian calendar: 52 BC; LII BC
- Ab urbe condita: 702
- Ancient Egypt era: XXXIII dynasty, 272
- Pharaoh: Ptolemy XII Auletes, 29
- Ancient Greek Olympiad (summer): 182nd Olympiad (victor)¹
- Assyrian calendar: 4699
- Balinese saka calendar: N/A
- Bengali calendar: −645 – −644
- Berber calendar: 899
- Buddhist calendar: 493
- Burmese calendar: −689
- Byzantine calendar: 5457–5458
- Chinese calendar: 戊辰年 (Earth Dragon); 2646 or 2439 — to — 己巳年 (Earth Snake); 2647 or 2440
- Coptic calendar: −335 – −334
- Discordian calendar: 1115
- Ethiopian calendar: −59 – −58
- Hebrew calendar: 3709–3710
- Hindu calendars
- Vikram Samvat: 5–6
- Shaka Samvat: N/A
- Kali Yuga: 3049–3050
- Holocene calendar: 9949
- Iranian calendar: 673 BP – 672 BP
- Islamic calendar: 694 BH – 693 BH
- Javanese calendar: N/A
- Julian calendar: N/A
- Korean calendar: 2282
- Minguo calendar: 1963 before ROC 民前1963年
- Nanakshahi calendar: −1519
- Seleucid era: 260/261 AG
- Thai solar calendar: 491–492
- Tibetan calendar: ས་ཕོ་འབྲུག་ལོ་ (male Earth-Dragon); 75 or −306 or −1078 — to — ས་མོ་སྦྲུལ་ལོ་ (female Earth-Snake); 76 or −305 or −1077

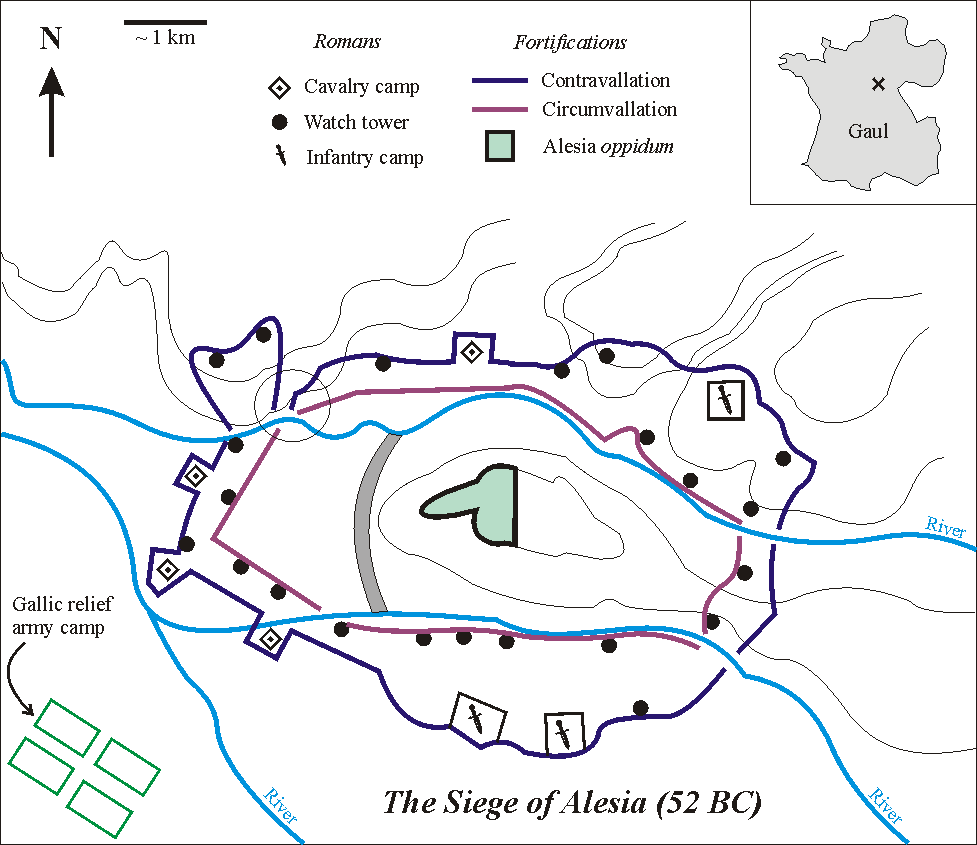
The Siege of Alesia (52 BC)

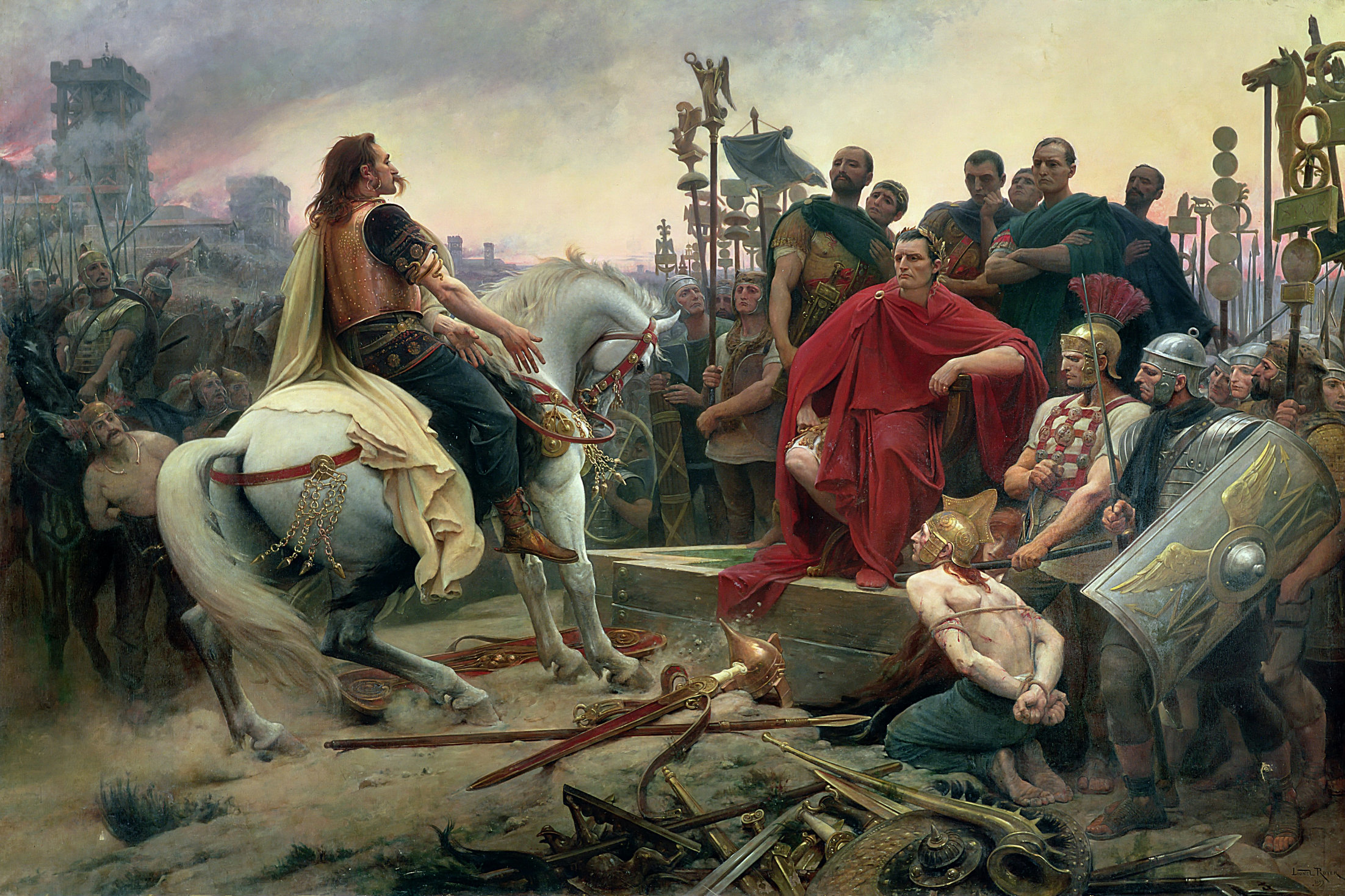
Vercingetorix surrenders to Julius Caesar

Year 52 BC was a year of the pre-Julian Roman calendar. At the time, it was known as the Year of the Consulship of Pompeius and Scipio (or, less frequently, year 702 Ab urbe condita). The denomination 52 BC for this year has been used since the early medieval period, when the Anno Domini calendar era became the prevalent method in Europe for naming years.

== Events ==
=== By place ===
==== Roman Republic ====
- Consuls: Quintus Caecilius Metellus Pius Scipio Nasica and Gnaeus Pompeius Magnus.
- Gnaeus Pompeius marries Cornelia Metella.
- Milo is tried for the murder of Clodius. Despite Cicero's legal defence (Pro Milone) he is found guilty and exiled in Massilia (modern Marseille).
- Gallic Wars (Julius Caesar):
  - March – Siege and capture of Avaricum (Bourges).
  - April–May – Siege and repulse from Gergovia.
  - July – Battle of the Vingeanne: Julius Caesar rebuffs, with his German auxiliaries, a Gallic cavalry attack of Vercingetorix.
  - Summer – Siege of Alesia: Julius Caesar spreads out his legions around the Oppidum and builds a string of fortifications surrounding the stronghold of Alesia.
  - September – Battle of Alesia: Julius Caesar defeats the Gallic allies coming to aid Vercingetorix, led by his cousin Vercassivellanus. Vercingetorix surrenders on October 3, signalling the Roman conquest of Gaul. The final pacification of Gaul is completed the following year.
  - Winter – Julius Caesar crosses Mons Cevenna (central Gaul) and sends his army through the passes covered with snowdrifts to take the rebellious Arverni by surprise.

== Births ==
- Fenestella, Roman historian (approximate date)
- Juba II, king of Numidia (d. AD 23)

== Deaths ==
- January 18 – Publius Clodius Pulcher, murdered on the Appian Way by Titus Annius Milo (b. 93 BC)
- Cyrus, Roman architect (builder for Cicero)
- Sedullos, Gaulish chieftain (b.87 BC)
- Surena, Parthian general (b. 84 BC)
