= 89 BC =

89 BC in various calendars
- Gregorian calendar: 89 BC; LXXXIX BC
- Ab urbe condita: 665
- Ancient Egypt era: XXXIII dynasty, 235
- Pharaoh: Ptolemy X Alexander, 19
- Ancient Greek Olympiad (summer): 172nd Olympiad, year 4
- Assyrian calendar: 4662
- Balinese saka calendar: N/A
- Bengali calendar: −682 – −681
- Berber calendar: 862
- Buddhist calendar: 456
- Burmese calendar: −726
- Byzantine calendar: 5420–5421
- Chinese calendar: 辛卯年 (Metal Rabbit); 2609 or 2402 — to — 壬辰年 (Water Dragon); 2610 or 2403
- Coptic calendar: −372 – −371
- Discordian calendar: 1078
- Ethiopian calendar: −96 – −95
- Hebrew calendar: 3672–3673
- Hindu calendars
- Vikram Samvat: −32 – −31
- Shaka Samvat: N/A
- Kali Yuga: 3012–3013
- Holocene calendar: 9912
- Iranian calendar: 710 BP – 709 BP
- Islamic calendar: 732 BH – 731 BH
- Javanese calendar: N/A
- Julian calendar: N/A
- Korean calendar: 2245
- Minguo calendar: 2000 before ROC 民前2000年
- Nanakshahi calendar: −1556
- Seleucid era: 223/224 AG
- Thai solar calendar: 454–455
- Tibetan calendar: ལྕགས་མོ་ཡོས་ལོ་ (female Iron-Hare); 38 or −343 or −1115 — to — ཆུ་ཕོ་འབྲུག་ལོ་ (male Water-Dragon); 39 or −342 or −1114

Map of Asia Minor (89 BC)

Year 89 BC was a year of the pre-Julian Roman calendar. At the time it was known as the Year of the Consulship of Strabo and Cato (or, less frequently, year 665 Ab urbe condita) and the Fourth Year of Zhenghe. The denomination 89 BC for this year has been used since the early medieval period, when the Anno Domini calendar era became the prevalent method in Europe for naming years.

== Events ==
=== By place ===
==== Roman Republic ====
- Consuls: Gnaeus Pompeius Strabo and Lucius Porcius Cato.
- Social War:
  - Roman forces under Lucius Porcius Cato are defeated by the Italian rebels in the Battle of Fucine Lake, Cato is killed.
  - The Roman army of Gnaeus Pompeius Strabo decisively defeats the rebels in the Battle of Asculum.
- Lex Plautia Papiria extends citizenship to all Italians who applied for it within 60 days. The new citizens are enrolled in eight designated tribes, to prevent domination of the assemblies.
- Lex Pompeia grants Latin rights to cities in Cisalpine Gaul.
- Pompeii is annexed by the Roman Republic.
- Cicero ends his service in the Roman army.

==== Asia Minor ====
- Mithridates VI of Pontus invades Bithynia and Cappadocia, thus beginning the First Mithridatic War.

==== Xiongnu ====
- The former Han General-in-Chief Li Guangli, now the son-in-law of Hulugu Chanyu, is arrested and sacrificed to the gods to restore the health of Hulugu's mother.

== Births ==
- Empress Shangguan, wife to Emperor Zhao of Han (d. 37 BC)
- Marcus Aemilius Lepidus, Roman politician and general (d. 12 BC)

== Deaths ==
- Aulus Sempronius Asellio, Roman praetor (murdered by creditors)
- Lucius Porcius Cato, Roman politician and general
- Marcus Aemilius Scaurus, Roman politician (b. c. 163 BC)
- Titus Didius, killed in battle during the Social War
- Li Guangli, Chinese General-in-Chief (Han dynasty)
