= 34 BC =

34 BC in various calendars
- Gregorian calendar: 34 BC; XXXIV BC
- Ab urbe condita: 720
- Ancient Egypt era: XXXIII dynasty, 290
- Pharaoh: Cleopatra VII, 18
- Ancient Greek Olympiad (summer): 186th Olympiad, year 3
- Assyrian calendar: 4717
- Balinese saka calendar: N/A
- Bengali calendar: −627 – −626
- Berber calendar: 917
- Buddhist calendar: 511
- Burmese calendar: −671
- Byzantine calendar: 5475–5476
- Chinese calendar: 丙戌年 (Fire Dog); 2664 or 2457 — to — 丁亥年 (Fire Pig); 2665 or 2458
- Coptic calendar: −317 – −316
- Discordian calendar: 1133
- Ethiopian calendar: −41 – −40
- Hebrew calendar: 3727–3728
- Hindu calendars
- Vikram Samvat: 23–24
- Shaka Samvat: N/A
- Kali Yuga: 3067–3068
- Holocene calendar: 9967
- Iranian calendar: 655 BP – 654 BP
- Islamic calendar: 675 BH – 674 BH
- Javanese calendar: N/A
- Julian calendar: 34 BC; XXXIV BC
- Korean calendar: 2300
- Minguo calendar: 1945 before ROC 民前1945年
- Nanakshahi calendar: −1501
- Seleucid era: 278/279 AG
- Thai solar calendar: 509–510
- Tibetan calendar: མེ་ཕོ་ཁྱི་ལོ་ (male Fire-Dog); 93 or −288 or −1060 — to — མེ་མོ་ཕག་ལོ་ (female Fire-Boar); 94 or −287 or −1059

Year 34 BC was either a common year starting on Friday, Saturday or Sunday or a leap year starting on Friday or Saturday of the Julian calendar (the sources differ, see leap year error for further information) and a common year starting on Friday of the Proleptic Julian calendar. At the time, it was known as the Year of the Consulship of Antonius and Libo (or, less frequently, year 720 Ab urbe condita). The denomination 34 BC for this year has been used since the early medieval period, when the Anno Domini calendar era became the prevalent method in Europe for naming years.

== Events ==
=== By place ===
==== Roman Republic ====
- Gaius Julius Caesar Octavian pacifies Dalmatia and Pannonia forming the province of Illyricum, while Antony regains Armenia from Parthia. Octavian reduces the outposts defending the Liburnian town of Promona, sets up siege works and forces its surrender.
- Mark Antony becomes Roman Consul for the second time. His partner is Lucius Scribonius Libo. The latter is replaced with Aemilius Lepidus Paullus during the year.
- Antony advances into Armenia with an expeditionary force (16 legions) and marches to the capital Artaxata. He arrests king Artavasdes II and takes him to Alexandria.
- Autumn – The Donations of Alexandria: Antony distributes the eastern kingdoms as a gift to the children of Cleopatra; he declares Caesarion, Caesar's illegitimate son, as co-ruler of Egypt and Cyprus. Alexander Helios receives Armenia and Media; to Cleopatra Selene II he gives the kingdoms of Cyrenaica and Libya. His youngest son Ptolemy Philadelphus receives the Egyptian possessions in Phoenicia, Syria and Cilicia. Antony establishes Cleopatra as a Hellenistic monarch at Alexandria and gives her the title of "Queen of Kings".
