= 38 BC =

38 BC in various calendars
- Gregorian calendar: 38 BC; XXXVIII BC
- Ab urbe condita: 716
- Ancient Egypt era: XXXIII dynasty, 286
- Pharaoh: Cleopatra VII, 14
- Ancient Greek Olympiad (summer): 185th Olympiad, year 3
- Assyrian calendar: 4713
- Balinese saka calendar: N/A
- Bengali calendar: −631 – −630
- Berber calendar: 913
- Buddhist calendar: 507
- Burmese calendar: −675
- Byzantine calendar: 5471–5472
- Chinese calendar: 壬午年 (Water Horse); 2660 or 2453 — to — 癸未年 (Water Goat); 2661 or 2454
- Coptic calendar: −321 – −320
- Discordian calendar: 1129
- Ethiopian calendar: −45 – −44
- Hebrew calendar: 3723–3724
- Hindu calendars
- Vikram Samvat: 19–20
- Shaka Samvat: N/A
- Kali Yuga: 3063–3064
- Holocene calendar: 9963
- Iranian calendar: 659 BP – 658 BP
- Islamic calendar: 679 BH – 678 BH
- Javanese calendar: N/A
- Julian calendar: 38 BC; XXXVIII BC
- Korean calendar: 2296
- Minguo calendar: 1949 before ROC 民前1949年
- Nanakshahi calendar: −1505
- Seleucid era: 274/275 AG
- Thai solar calendar: 505–506
- Tibetan calendar: ཆུ་ཕོ་རྟ་ལོ་ (male Water-Horse); 89 or −292 or −1064 — to — ཆུ་མོ་ལུག་ལོ་ (female Water-Sheep); 90 or −291 or −1063

Year 38 BC was either a common year starting on Sunday or Monday or a leap year starting on Saturday, Sunday or Monday of the Julian calendar (the sources differ, see leap year error for further information) and a common year starting on Sunday of the Proleptic Julian calendar. At the time, it was known as the Year of the Consulship of Pulcher and Flaccus (or, less frequently, year 716 Ab urbe condita). The denomination 38 BC for this year has been used since the early medieval period, when the Anno Domini calendar era became the prevalent method in Europe for naming years. It was also the first year (year 1) of the Spanish era calendar in use in Hispania until the 15th century.

== Events ==
=== By place ===
==== Roman Republic ====
- January 1 – Beginning of the Hispanic era.
- January 17 – Octavian marries Livia while she is still pregnant from a recently broken marriage. Octavian gained permission from the College of Pontiffs to wed her while she is still pregnant from another husband. Three months after the wedding she gives birth to a second son, Nero Claudius Drusus, while he and his elder brother, the four-year-old Tiberius, are living in Octavian's household.
- Octavian appoints Marcus Vipsanius Agrippa governor of Transalpine Gaul, where he puts down an uprising of the Aquitanians. He also fights successfully against the Germanic tribes, and becomes the next Roman general to cross the Rhine after Julius Caesar.

== Births ==
- January 14 – Nero Claudius Drusus, Roman politician and military commander, future stepson of Augustus Caesar (d. 9 BC)
- Lucius Volusius Saturninus, Roman suffect consul (or 37 BC)

== Deaths ==
- Antiochus I, king of Commagene (b. c. 86 BC)
- Pacorus I, crown prince of Parthia (b. c. 63 BC)
