= 58 BC =

58 BC in various calendars
- Gregorian calendar: 58 BC; LVIII BC
- Ab urbe condita: 696
- Ancient Egypt era: XXXIII dynasty, 266
- Pharaoh: Ptolemy XII Auletes, 23
- Ancient Greek Olympiad (summer): 180th Olympiad, year 3
- Assyrian calendar: 4693
- Balinese saka calendar: N/A
- Bengali calendar: −651 – −650
- Berber calendar: 893
- Buddhist calendar: 487
- Burmese calendar: −695
- Byzantine calendar: 5451–5452
- Chinese calendar: 壬戌年 (Water Dog); 2640 or 2433 — to — 癸亥年 (Water Pig); 2641 or 2434
- Coptic calendar: −341 – −340
- Discordian calendar: 1109
- Ethiopian calendar: −65 – −64
- Hebrew calendar: 3703–3704
- Hindu calendars
- Vikram Samvat: −1 – 0
- Shaka Samvat: N/A
- Kali Yuga: 3043–3044
- Holocene calendar: 9943
- Iranian calendar: 679 BP – 678 BP
- Islamic calendar: 700 BH – 699 BH
- Javanese calendar: N/A
- Julian calendar: N/A
- Korean calendar: 2276
- Minguo calendar: 1969 before ROC 民前1969年
- Nanakshahi calendar: −1525
- Seleucid era: 254/255 AG
- Thai solar calendar: 485–486
- Tibetan calendar: ཆུ་ཕོ་ཁྱི་ལོ་ (male Water-Dog); 69 or −312 or −1084 — to — ཆུ་མོ་ཕག་ལོ་ (female Water-Boar); 70 or −311 or −1083

Map of the Gallic Wars (58–50 BC)

Year 58 BC was a year of the pre-Julian Roman calendar. At the time, it was known as the Year of the Consulship of Piso and Gabinius (or, less frequently, year 696 Ab urbe condita). The denomination 58 BC for this year has been used since the early medieval period, when the Anno Domini calendar era became the prevalent method in Europe for naming years.

== Events ==
=== By place ===
==== Roman Republic ====
- Consuls: Lucius Calpurnius Piso Caesoninus and Aulus Gabinius.
- Publius Clodius Pulcher, Roman tribune, institutes a monthly corn dole for poor Romans, and exiles Cicero from the city.
- Cyprus becomes a Roman province.
- First year of Julius Caesar's Gallic Wars:
  - Julius Caesar becomes a provincial governor (proconsul) and leads a Roman army (6 Roman legions; Legio VII, Legio VIII, Legio IX, Legio X, and newly levied Legio XI and Legio XII) into Gaul. He deploys auxiliaries as part of this army, including Balearic slingers, Numidian and Cretan archers, and Celtic/Gallic cavalry (such as the allied Aedui).
  - Caesar builds a 19-mile earthwork, complete with fortifications and watchtowers, between Lake Geneva and the Jura Mountains.
  - June – Caesar defeats the migrating Helvetii in the Battle of the Arar (Saône).
  - July – Caesar decisively defeats the Helvetii in the Battle of Bibracte.
  - September – Caesar decisively defeats the Suebi led by King Ariovistus in the Battle of Vosges.
  - Winter – Caesar leaves his legions in winter quarters among the Sequani (located in modern-day Burgundy) far to the north of the formal boundary of Gallia Transalpina. He returns to Gallia Cisalpina, carrying out judicial and administrative activities.

==== Egypt ====
- Berenice IV becomes queen of Egypt after temporarily dethroning her father, King Ptolemy XII Auletes.

==== Asia ====
- Base year of the Vikrama Era, founded by Vikrama, king of Ujjain in India.

== Births ==
- Jumong (King Dongmyeong), king of Goguryeo (d. AD 19)
- Attica, first wife of the Roman general Marcus Vipsanius Agrippa

== Deaths ==
- Go Museo Dangun, 6th ruler of Buyeo (Korea)
- Ptolemy of Cyprus, last Hellenistic king of Cyprus
