= 61 BC =

61 BC in various calendars
- Gregorian calendar: 61 BC; LXI BC
- Ab urbe condita: 693
- Ancient Egypt era: XXXIII dynasty, 263
- Pharaoh: Ptolemy XII Auletes, 20
- Ancient Greek Olympiad (summer): 179th Olympiad, year 4
- Assyrian calendar: 4690
- Balinese saka calendar: N/A
- Bengali calendar: −654 – −653
- Berber calendar: 890
- Buddhist calendar: 484
- Burmese calendar: −698
- Byzantine calendar: 5448–5449
- Chinese calendar: 己未年 (Earth Goat); 2637 or 2430 — to — 庚申年 (Metal Monkey); 2638 or 2431
- Coptic calendar: −344 – −343
- Discordian calendar: 1106
- Ethiopian calendar: −68 – −67
- Hebrew calendar: 3700–3701
- Hindu calendars
- Vikram Samvat: −4 – −3
- Shaka Samvat: N/A
- Kali Yuga: 3040–3041
- Holocene calendar: 9940
- Iranian calendar: 682 BP – 681 BP
- Islamic calendar: 703 BH – 702 BH
- Javanese calendar: N/A
- Julian calendar: N/A
- Korean calendar: 2273
- Minguo calendar: 1972 before ROC 民前1972年
- Nanakshahi calendar: −1528
- Seleucid era: 251/252 AG
- Thai solar calendar: 482–483
- Tibetan calendar: ས་མོ་ལུག་ལོ་ (female Earth-Sheep); 66 or −315 or −1087 — to — ལྕགས་ཕོ་སྤྲེ་ལོ་ (male Iron-Monkey); 67 or −314 or −1086

Year 61 BC was a year of the pre-Julian Roman calendar. At the time it was known as the Year of the Consulship of Calpurnianus and Messalla (or, less frequently, year 693 Ab urbe condita). The denomination 61 BC for this year has been used since the early medieval period, when the Anno Domini calendar era became the prevalent method in Europe for naming years.

== Events ==
=== By place ===
==== Roman Republic ====
- Pompey returns to Rome with a triumph in honor of his victories in the eastern provinces.
- Marcus Pupius Piso Frugi as consul attempts to gain ratification of Pompey's Eastern Settlement.
- Julius Caesar becomes governor in Hispania and creates Legio X Gemina (3,500 men). He puts down the Callaici and Lusitani rebellions.

== Deaths ==
- Quintus Marcius Rex, Roman consul and general
