= 73 BC =

73 BC in various calendars
Gregorian calendar	73 BC; LXXIII BC
Ab urbe condita	681
Ancient Egypt era	XXXIII dynasty, 251
Pharaoh	Ptolemy XII Auletes, 8
Ancient Greek Olympiad (summer)	176th Olympiad, year 4
Assyrian calendar	4678
Balinese saka calendar	N/A
Bengali calendar	−666 – −665
Berber calendar	878
Buddhist calendar	472
Burmese calendar	−710
Byzantine calendar	5436–5437
Chinese calendar	丁未年 (Fire Goat); 2625 or 2418 — to — 戊申年 (Earth Monkey); 2626 or 2419
Coptic calendar	−356 – −355
Discordian calendar	1094
Ethiopian calendar	−80 – −79
Hebrew calendar	3688–3689
- Hindu calendars
Vikram Samvat	−16 – −15
Shaka Samvat	N/A
Kali Yuga	3028–3029
Holocene calendar	9928
Iranian calendar	694 BP – 693 BP
Islamic calendar	715 BH – 714 BH
Javanese calendar	N/A
Julian calendar	N/A
Korean calendar	2261
Minguo calendar	1984 before ROC 民前1984年
Nanakshahi calendar	−1540
Seleucid era	239/240 AG
Thai solar calendar	470–471
Tibetan calendar	阴火羊年 (female Fire-Goat); 54 or −327 or −1099 — to — 阳土猴年 (male Earth-Monkey); 55 or −326 or −1098

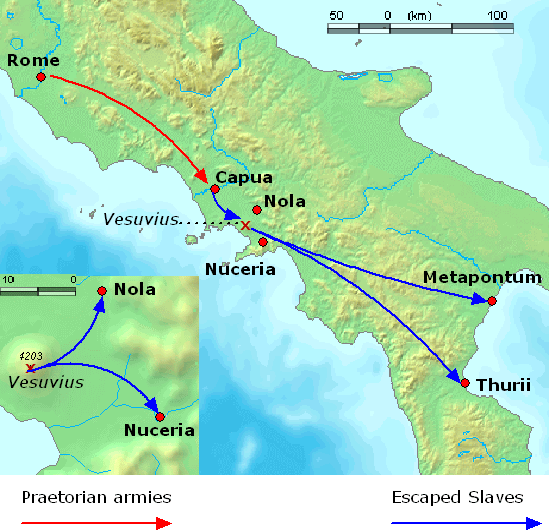
Movements of Roman and Slave forces from the Capuan revolt up to the end of winter 73–72 BC in Southern Italy.

Year 73 BC was a year of the pre-Julian Roman calendar. At the time it was known as the Year of the Consulship of Lucullus and Longinus (or, less frequently, year 681 Ab urbe condita). The denomination 73 BC for this year has been used since the early medieval period, when the Anno Domini calendar era became the prevalent method in Europe for naming years.

== Events ==
=== By place ===
==== Roman Republic ====
- Third Servile War: Spartacus, a Thracian gladiator, escapes with around 70 slave-gladiators from a gladiator school at Capua. They defeat a small Roman force and equip themselves with captured military equipment as well with gladiatorial weapons. Spartacus and his band of gladiators plunder the region surrounding Capua and retire to a defensible position on Mount Vesuvius.
- Battle of Mount Vesuvius: Spartacus defeats a Roman militia force (3,000 men) under Gaius Claudius Glaber. The rebel slaves spend the winter of 73–72 BC training, arming and equipping their new recruits, as well as expanding their raiding territory, which includes the towns of Nola, Nuceria, Thurii and Metapontum.
- On the Iberian Peninsula (part of the Roman Republic) rebel leader Quintus Sertorius is assassinated by some of his own lieutenants (lead by Marcus Perperna). (Note: the year of his assassination is disputed – the debate is whether he was assassinated in 73 or 72 BCE) Perperna takes command of the rebel army.

== Births ==
- Herod the Great, client king of Judea (d. 4 BC)
- Marcus Porcius Cato, assassin of Julius Caesar (d. 42 BC)

== Deaths ==
- Devabhuti, king of the Shunga Empire
- Gaius Aurelius Cotta, Roman statesman and orator
- Quintus Sertorius, leader of the Sertorian rebels during the Sertorian War
- Heli, king of Britain (approximate date)
