= 93 BC =

93 BC in various calendars
- Gregorian calendar: 93 BC; XCIII BC
- Ab urbe condita: 661
- Ancient Egypt era: XXXIII dynasty, 231
- Pharaoh: Ptolemy X Alexander, 15
- Ancient Greek Olympiad (summer): 171st Olympiad, year 4
- Assyrian calendar: 4658
- Balinese saka calendar: N/A
- Bengali calendar: −686 – −685
- Berber calendar: 858
- Buddhist calendar: 452
- Burmese calendar: −730
- Byzantine calendar: 5416–5417
- Chinese calendar: 丁亥年 (Fire Pig); 2605 or 2398 — to — 戊子年 (Earth Rat); 2606 or 2399
- Coptic calendar: −376 – −375
- Discordian calendar: 1074
- Ethiopian calendar: −100 – −99
- Hebrew calendar: 3668–3669
- Hindu calendars
- Vikram Samvat: −36 – −35
- Shaka Samvat: N/A
- Kali Yuga: 3008–3009
- Holocene calendar: 9908
- Iranian calendar: 714 BP – 713 BP
- Islamic calendar: 736 BH – 735 BH
- Javanese calendar: N/A
- Julian calendar: N/A
- Korean calendar: 2241
- Minguo calendar: 2004 before ROC 民前2004年
- Nanakshahi calendar: −1560
- Seleucid era: 219/220 AG
- Thai solar calendar: 450–451
- Tibetan calendar: མེ་མོ་ཕག་ལོ་ (female Fire-Boar); 34 or −347 or −1119 — to — ས་ཕོ་བྱི་བ་ལོ་ (male Earth-Rat); 35 or −346 or −1118

Year 93 BC was a year of the pre-Julian Roman calendar. At the time it was known as the Year of the Consulship of Flaccus and Herennius (or, less frequently, year 661 Ab urbe condita). The denomination 93 BC for this year has been used since the early medieval period, when the Anno Domini calendar era became the prevalent method in Europe for naming years.

== Events ==
=== By place ===
==== Roman republic ====
- Roman consuls: Gaius Valerius Flaccus and Marcus Herennius.

==== East Asia ====
- End of era Taishi of Emperor Wu of Han China.

== Deaths ==
- Antiochus XI, king of the Seleucid Empire
