= Publius Rutilius Lupus (rhetorician) =

Publius Rutilius Lupus (fl. c. 25 AD) was a Roman rhetorician who flourished during the reign of Tiberius. He was the author of a treatise on the figures of speech (de Figuris sententiarum et elocutionis), abridged from a similar work by the rhetorician Gorgias of Athens, who was the tutor of Cicero the Younger. In its present form the treatise is incomplete, as is clearly shown by the express testimony of Quintilian (Inst. ix.2.101–105 passim). Lupus also dealt with figures of sense and other rhetorical figures. The work is valuable chiefly as containing a number of examples, well translated into Latin, from the lost works of Greek rhetoricians. The author has been identified with the Lupus mentioned in the Ovidian catalogue of poets (Ex Ponto, iv.16), and was perhaps the son of the Publius Rutilius Lupus, who was a strong supporter of Pompey.

== Editions ==
- D. Ruhnken (1768)
- F. Jacob (1837)
- Karl Halm in Rhetores Latini minores (1863)
- Edward Brooks Jr. (1970)
- Drew Kopp and Hans-Friedrich Mueller (2024)

See also monographs by G. Dzialas (1860 and 1869), C. Schmidt (1865), J. Draheim (1874), Thilo Krieg (1896).
