= 95 BC =

== Overview ==
95 BC in various calendars
- Gregorian calendar: 95 BC; XCV BC
- Ab urbe condita: 659
- Ancient Egypt era: XXXIII dynasty, 229
- Pharaoh: Ptolemy X Alexander, 13
- Ancient Greek Olympiad (summer): 171st Olympiad, year 2
- Assyrian calendar: 4656
- Balinese saka calendar: N/A
- Bengali calendar: −688 – −687
- Berber calendar: 856
- Buddhist calendar: 450
- Burmese calendar: −732
- Byzantine calendar: 5414–5415
- Chinese calendar: 乙酉年 (Wood Rooster); 2603 or 2396 — to — 丙戌年 (Fire Dog); 2604 or 2397
- Coptic calendar: −378 – −377
- Discordian calendar: 1072
- Ethiopian calendar: −102 – −101
- Hebrew calendar: 3666–3667
- Hindu calendars
- Vikram Samvat: −38 – −37
- Shaka Samvat: N/A
- Kali Yuga: 3006–3007
- Holocene calendar: 9906
- Iranian calendar: 716 BP – 715 BP
- Islamic calendar: 738 BH – 737 BH
- Javanese calendar: N/A
- Julian calendar: N/A
- Korean calendar: 2239
- Minguo calendar: 2006 before ROC 民前2006年
- Nanakshahi calendar: −1562
- Seleucid era: 217/218 AG
- Thai solar calendar: 448–449
- Tibetan calendar: ཤིང་མོ་བྱ་ལོ་ (female Wood-Bird); 32 or −349 or −1121 — to — མེ་ཕོ་ཁྱི་ལོ་ (male Fire-Dog); 33 or −348 or −1120

Year 95 BC was a year of the pre-Julian Roman calendar. At the time it was known as the Year of the Consulship of Crassus and Scaevola (or, less frequently, year 659 Ab urbe condita) and the Second Year of Taishi. The denomination 95 BC for this year has been used since the early medieval period when the Anno Domini calendar era became the prevalent method in Europe for naming years.

In Rome, the consuls Lucius Licinius Crassus and Quintus Mucius Scaevola Pontifex passed the Lex Licinia Mucia, a law that removed non-citizens from the citizen rolls.

== Events ==
=== By place ===
==== Rome ====
- Consuls: Lucius Licinius Crassus and Quintus Mucius Scaevola Pontifex

==== Seleucid kingdom ====
- Philip I Philadelphus and Antiochus XI Ephiphanes succeeded as co-rulers after the deposition of Seleucus VI Epiphanes.

==== Ireland ====
- "Forty-metre structure" at Emain Macha (near modern Armagh, Northern Ireland) was built and destroyed, presumably for ritual or ceremonial purposes.

==== Asia Minor ====
- Ariobarzanes I Philoromaios becomes king of Cappadocia with Roman backing.
- Tigranes the Great becomes king of Armenia

== Births ==
- Clodia, daughter of Appius Claudius Pulcher
- Marcus Porcius Cato Uticensis, Roman politician (d. 46 BC)
