= 71 BC =

71 BC in various calendars
- Gregorian calendar: 71 BC; LXXI BC
- Ab urbe condita: 683
- Ancient Egypt era: XXXIII dynasty, 253
- Pharaoh: Ptolemy XII Auletes, 10
- Ancient Greek Olympiad (summer): 177th Olympiad, year 2
- Assyrian calendar: 4680
- Balinese saka calendar: N/A
- Bengali calendar: −664 – −663
- Berber calendar: 880
- Buddhist calendar: 474
- Burmese calendar: −708
- Byzantine calendar: 5438–5439
- Chinese calendar: 己酉年 (Earth Rooster); 2627 or 2420 — to — 庚戌年 (Metal Dog); 2628 or 2421
- Coptic calendar: −354 – −353
- Discordian calendar: 1096
- Ethiopian calendar: −78 – −77
- Hebrew calendar: 3690–3691
- Hindu calendars
- Vikram Samvat: −14 – −13
- Shaka Samvat: N/A
- Kali Yuga: 3030–3031
- Holocene calendar: 9930
- Iranian calendar: 692 BP – 691 BP
- Islamic calendar: 713 BH – 712 BH
- Javanese calendar: N/A
- Julian calendar: N/A
- Korean calendar: 2263
- Minguo calendar: 1982 before ROC 民前1982年
- Nanakshahi calendar: −1538
- Seleucid era: 241/242 AG
- Thai solar calendar: 472–473
- Tibetan calendar: ས་མོ་བྱ་ལོ་ (female Earth-Bird); 56 or −325 or −1097 — to — ལྕགས་ཕོ་ཁྱི་ལོ་ (male Iron-Dog); 57 or −324 or −1096

Year 71 BC was a year of the pre-Julian Roman calendar. At the time it was known as the Year of the Consulship of Lentulus and Orestes (or, less frequently, year 683 Ab urbe condita). The denomination 71 BC for this year has been used since the early medieval period, when the Anno Domini calendar era became the prevalent method in Europe for naming years.

== Events ==
=== By place ===
==== Roman Republic ====
- Third Servile War ends; Slave rebellion under leadership of Spartacus is crushed by a Roman army under Marcus Licinius Crassus. Slaves taken prisoner are crucified naked along the Via Appia.
- Marcus Antonius is defeated by the Cretans, who have made an alliance with the pirates. He is compelled to concede a humiliating peace. Antonius dies in office the same year and is awarded, posthumously, with the cognomen Creticus.
- Nessebar in modern-day Bulgaria comes under Roman rule.

== Births ==
- Wang Zhengjun, Chinese empress of the Han dynasty (d. AD 13)

== Deaths ==
- Castus, Gallic gladiator and rebel leader
- Gannicus, Celtic gladiator and rebel leader
- Marcus Antonius Creticus, Roman politician (father of Mark Antony)
- Spartacus, Thracian gladiator and rebel leader (presumably killed in battle) (b. 109 BC)
- Xu Pingjun, Chinese empress of the Han dynasty
