= 81 BC =

81 BC in various calendars
- Gregorian calendar: 81 BC; LXXXI BC
- Ab urbe condita: 673
- Ancient Egypt era: XXXIII dynasty, 243
- Pharaoh: Ptolemy IX Lathyros, 8
- Ancient Greek Olympiad (summer): 174th Olympiad, year 4
- Assyrian calendar: 4670
- Balinese saka calendar: N/A
- Bengali calendar: −674 – −673
- Berber calendar: 870
- Buddhist calendar: 464
- Burmese calendar: −718
- Byzantine calendar: 5428–5429
- Chinese calendar: 己亥年 (Earth Pig); 2617 or 2410 — to — 庚子年 (Metal Rat); 2618 or 2411
- Coptic calendar: −364 – −363
- Discordian calendar: 1086
- Ethiopian calendar: −88 – −87
- Hebrew calendar: 3680–3681
- Hindu calendars
- Vikram Samvat: −24 – −23
- Shaka Samvat: N/A
- Kali Yuga: 3020–3021
- Holocene calendar: 9920
- Iranian calendar: 702 BP – 701 BP
- Islamic calendar: 724 BH – 723 BH
- Javanese calendar: N/A
- Julian calendar: N/A
- Korean calendar: 2253
- Minguo calendar: 1992 before ROC 民前1992年
- Nanakshahi calendar: −1548
- Seleucid era: 231/232 AG
- Thai solar calendar: 462–463
- Tibetan calendar: ས་མོ་ཕག་ལོ་ (female Earth-Boar); 46 or −335 or −1107 — to — ལྕགས་ཕོ་བྱི་བ་ལོ་ (male Iron-Rat); 47 or −334 or −1106

Year 81 BC was a year of the pre-Julian Roman calendar. At the time it was known as the Year of the Consulship of Decula and Dolabella (or, less frequently, year 673 Ab urbe condita). The denomination 81 BC for this year has been used since the early medieval period, when the Anno Domini calendar era became the prevalent method in Europe for naming years.

== Events ==
=== By place ===
==== Roman Republic ====
- Sulla is appointed dictator, executes his political enemies in a series of proscriptions, and implements aristocratic reforms to the Roman government.
- The Second Mithridatic War ends with the status quo.
- Cicero wins his first case.

==== China ====
- Sang Hongyang and 60 Confucian scholars debate over the state monopoly of Iron and Salt.

== Deaths ==
- Artaxias I (or Arshak), king of Iberia (Georgia)
- Gnaeus Domitius Ahenobarbus, Roman politician
- Ptolemy IX Lathyros, king of Ptolemaic Egypt
