= 80 BC =

80 BC in various calendars
Gregorian calendar	80 BC; LXXX BC
Ab urbe condita	674
Ancient Egypt era	XXXIII dynasty, 244
Pharaoh	Ptolemy XII Auletes, 1
Ancient Greek Olympiad (summer)	175th Olympiad (victor)¹
Assyrian calendar	4671
Balinese saka calendar	N/A
Bengali calendar	−673 – −672
Berber calendar	871
Buddhist calendar	465
Burmese calendar	−717
Byzantine calendar	5429–5430
Chinese calendar	庚子年 (Metal Rat); 2618 or 2411 — to — 辛丑年 (Metal Ox); 2619 or 2412
Coptic calendar	−363 – −362
Discordian calendar	1087
Ethiopian calendar	−87 – −86
Hebrew calendar	3681–3682
- Hindu calendars
Vikram Samvat	−23 – −22
Shaka Samvat	N/A
Kali Yuga	3021–3022
Holocene calendar	9921
Iranian calendar	701 BP – 700 BP
Islamic calendar	723 BH – 722 BH
Javanese calendar	N/A
Julian calendar	N/A
Korean calendar	2254
Minguo calendar	1991 before ROC 民前1991年
Nanakshahi calendar	−1547
Seleucid era	232/233 AG
Thai solar calendar	463–464
Tibetan calendar	阳金鼠年 (male Iron-Rat); 47 or −334 or −1106 — to — 阴金牛年 (female Iron-Ox); 48 or −333 or −1105

Year 80 BC was a year of the pre-Julian Roman calendar. At the time it was known as the Year of the Consulship of Sulla and Metellus Pius (or, less frequently, year 674 Ab urbe condita). The denomination 80 BC for this year has been used since the early medieval period, when the Anno Domini calendar era became the prevalent method in Europe for naming years.

== Events ==
=== By place ===
==== Roman Republic ====
- Quintus Sertorius re-enters Iberia with a tiny army (2,600 men) and opens a successful campaign against the Sullan forces.
- Battle of the Baetis River: A force of Populares exiles under Sertorius defeat the legal Roman army of Lucius Fulfidias in Hispania, starting the Sertorian War; Quintus Caecilius Metellus Pius takes command on behalf of Sulla.
- Pompeii becomes the Roman colony Colonia Cornelia Veneria Pompei when Sulla occupies the city with at least 4,000 soldier-colonizers.

==== Egypt ====
- Ptolemy XII Auletes succeeds Ptolemy XI Alexander II to the throne of Egypt.
- Ptolemy XI marries Berenice III, but murders his bride for unknown reasons.
- Alexandria comes under Roman jurisdiction.

=== By topic ===
==== Art ====
- Roman artists begin to extend the space of a room visually with painted scenes of figures on a shallow stage or with a landscape or cityscape.

==== Literature ====
- Meleager publishes his Garland, the earliest known anthology of Greek poetry.

== Births ==
- Scribonia, wife to the Roman Emperor Augustus (approximate date) (d. AD 16)

== Deaths ==
- Berenice III, queen regnant of Egypt (b. 120 BC)
- Caecilia Metella Dalmatica, daughter of Lucius Caecilius Metellus Dalmaticus (approximate date)
- Lucius Cornelius Chrysogonus, Greek freedman
- Ptolemy XI Alexander II, king (pharaoh) of Egypt
- Sang Hongyang, Chinese politician of the Han dynasty
- Shangguan Jie, Chinese politician of the Han dynasty
- Princess Eyi, Han Chinese princess
