= Ptolemy Apion =

Possible king of Cyrene, 116–96 BC

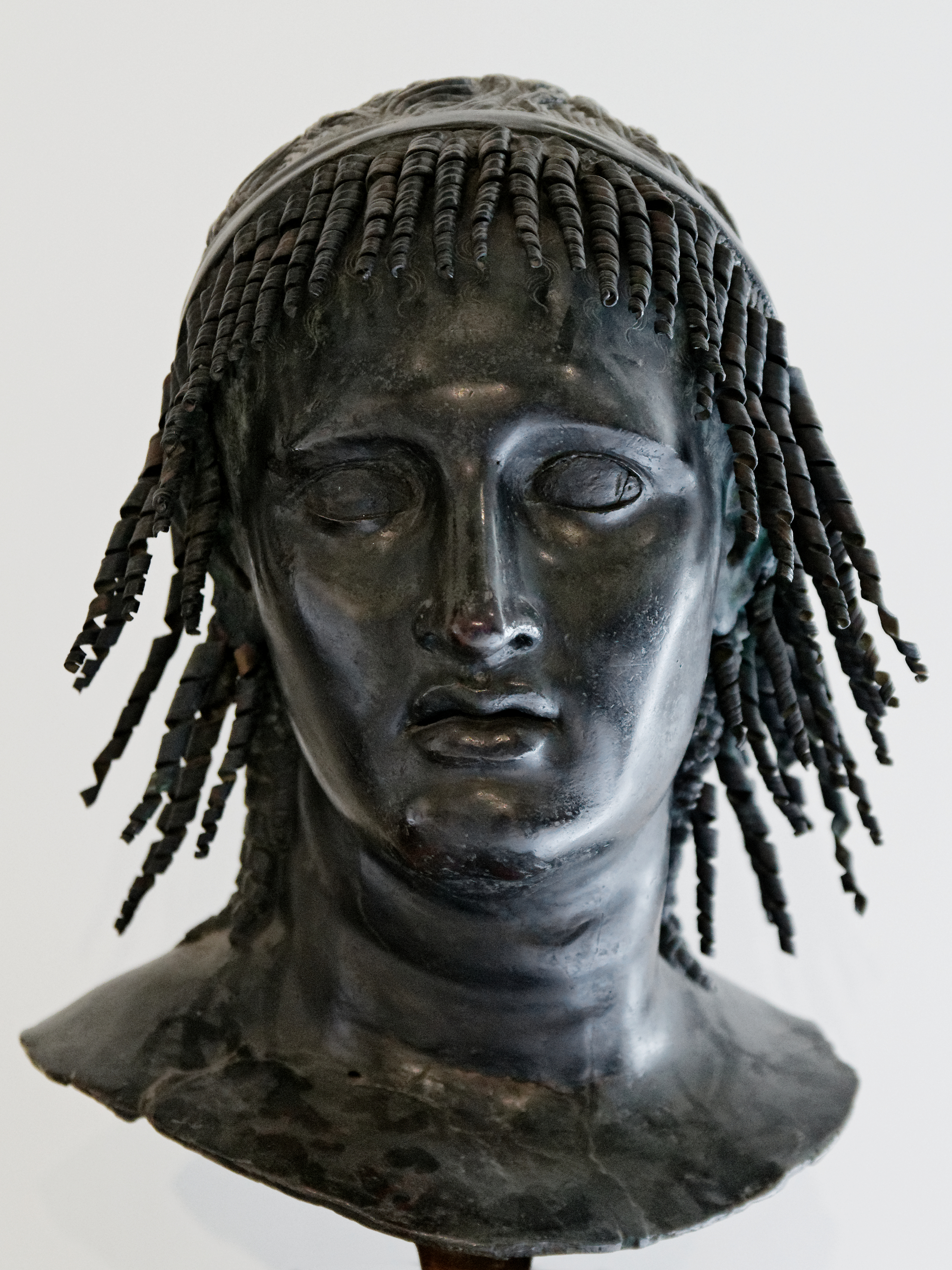
- Portrait of Ptolemy Apion from Herculaneum, presently located at the National Archaeological Museum, Naples.

King of Cyrene
- Born: 150-145 BC; Cyrene (?)
- Died: 96 BC
- Greek: Πτολεμαῖος Ἀπίων
- House: Ptolemaic dynasty
- Father: Ptolemy VIII Physcon
- Mother: Eirene of Cyrene

Ptolemy Apion or simply known as Apion (Ancient Greek: Πτολεμαῖος Ἀπίων; between 150 BC and 145 BC – 96 BC) was Greco-Egyptian King of Cyrenaica who separated it from the Ptolemaic Kingdom of Egypt, and in his last will bequeathed his country to Rome. He was a member of the Ptolemaic dynasty.

== Biography ==
Apion was the son of Ptolemy VIII Physcon, king of Egypt (170-165, 145-132, and 127-116) and king of Cyrene and Cyprus (163-116 BC), by a concubine. Apion's mother is often identified with Eirene, who was his mistress around 147 BC, but there is no evidence for this.

Ptolemy Apion was apparently given Cyrene as a separate kingdom ca. 105-101 BC. Nothing is recorded of Ptolemy's reign of Cyrenaica. Some scholars have doubted that he ever actually reigned. Ptolemy died in 96 BC without heirs. In Ptolemy's will, he left Cyrenaica and his ancestral royal estates to the rule of the Roman Republic.
