= 37 BC =

37 BC in various calendars
- Gregorian calendar: 37 BC; XXXVII BC
- Ab urbe condita: 717
- Ancient Egypt era: XXXIII dynasty, 287
- Pharaoh: Cleopatra VII, 15
- Ancient Greek Olympiad (summer): 185th Olympiad, year 4
- Assyrian calendar: 4714
- Balinese saka calendar: N/A
- Bengali calendar: −630 – −629
- Berber calendar: 914
- Buddhist calendar: 508
- Burmese calendar: −674
- Byzantine calendar: 5472–5473
- Chinese calendar: 癸未年 (Water Goat); 2661 or 2454 — to — 甲申年 (Wood Monkey); 2662 or 2455
- Coptic calendar: −320 – −319
- Discordian calendar: 1130
- Ethiopian calendar: −44 – −43
- Hebrew calendar: 3724–3725
- Hindu calendars
- Vikram Samvat: 20–21
- Shaka Samvat: N/A
- Kali Yuga: 3064–3065
- Holocene calendar: 9964
- Iranian calendar: 658 BP – 657 BP
- Islamic calendar: 678 BH – 677 BH
- Javanese calendar: N/A
- Julian calendar: 37 BC; XXXVII BC
- Korean calendar: 2297
- Minguo calendar: 1948 before ROC 民前1948年
- Nanakshahi calendar: −1504
- Seleucid era: 275/276 AG
- Thai solar calendar: 506–507
- Tibetan calendar: ཆུ་མོ་ལུག་ལོ་ (female Water-Sheep); 90 or −291 or −1063 — to — ཤིང་ཕོ་སྤྲེ་ལོ་ (male Wood-Monkey); 91 or −290 or −1062

Year 37 BC was either a common year starting on Monday, Tuesday or Wednesday or a leap year starting on Monday or Tuesday of the Julian calendar (the sources differ, see leap year error for further information) and a leap year starting on Monday of the Proleptic Julian calendar. At the time, it was known as the Year of the Consulship of Agrippa and Gallus (or, less frequently, year 717 Ab urbe condita). The denomination 37 BC for this year has been used since the early medieval period, when the Anno Domini calendar era became the prevalent method in Europe for naming years.

== Events ==
=== By place ===
==== Roman Republic ====
- Consuls: Marcus Vipsanius Agrippa and Titus Statilius Taurus.
- Agrippa creates the harbour "Portus Julius" in the today-submersed town of Puteoli (the modern Pozzuoli, close to Naples). The port is used to train the warships for naval battles, and a new fleet is built, with 20,000 oarsmen gathered by freeing slaves. He also incorporates, on quinqueremes, a technical innovation, called the harpax ("snatcher"): a combination ballista and grappling hook, based on the corvus.
- Caesar Augustus (Octavian) engineers the "Second Pact of Tarentum" which renews the Triumvirate for an additional five years. Mark Antony exchanges 120 ships, for service against Sextus Pompeius. Octavian Caesar donates 1,000 troops from the Praetorian Guard and 20,000 legionaries for the Parthian campaign in Syria.
- Antony reorganizes Asia Minor under strongmen loyal to him. He raises troops from his allies: Amyntas and Archelaus, kings of Galatia and Cappadocia. The old kingdom of Pontus is restored, from Armenia to the River Halys under Polemon I.
- Romans conquer Jerusalem from the Parthians. Herod the Great becomes king of Judea and Ananelus is installed as High Priest; both positions are seized from Antigonus II Mattathias after a five-month siege. Thousands of Jews are slaughtered by Roman troops supporting Herod.

==== Asia ====
- The kingdom of Goguryeo in Korea is founded by the king Dongmyeong. (traditional date)

== Deaths ==
- Antigonus II Mattathias (Antigonus the Hasmonean) (executed by order of Mark Antony)
- Aristobulus II, king and high priest of Judea (66–63 BC; assassinated)
- Jing Fang, Chinese mathematician and music theorist (b. 78 BC)
- Orodes II, king of the Parthian Empire (b. 95 BC)
- Shangguan, Chinese empress of the Han dynasty
