= 96 BC =

96 BC in various calendars
- Gregorian calendar: 96 BC; XCVI BC
- Ab urbe condita: 658
- Ancient Egypt era: XXXIII dynasty, 228
- Pharaoh: Ptolemy X Alexander, 12
- Ancient Greek Olympiad (summer): 171st Olympiad (victor)¹
- Assyrian calendar: 4655
- Balinese saka calendar: N/A
- Bengali calendar: −689 – −688
- Berber calendar: 855
- Buddhist calendar: 449
- Burmese calendar: −733
- Byzantine calendar: 5413–5414
- Chinese calendar: 甲申年 (Wood Monkey); 2602 or 2395 — to — 乙酉年 (Wood Rooster); 2603 or 2396
- Coptic calendar: −379 – −378
- Discordian calendar: 1071
- Ethiopian calendar: −103 – −102
- Hebrew calendar: 3665–3666
- Hindu calendars
- Vikram Samvat: −39 – −38
- Shaka Samvat: N/A
- Kali Yuga: 3005–3006
- Holocene calendar: 9905
- Iranian calendar: 717 BP – 716 BP
- Islamic calendar: 739 BH – 738 BH
- Javanese calendar: N/A
- Julian calendar: N/A
- Korean calendar: 2238
- Minguo calendar: 2007 before ROC 民前2007年
- Nanakshahi calendar: −1563
- Seleucid era: 216/217 AG
- Thai solar calendar: 447–448
- Tibetan calendar: ཤིང་ཕོ་སྤྲེ་ལོ་ (male Wood-Monkey); 31 or −350 or −1122 — to — ཤིང་མོ་བྱ་ལོ་ (female Wood-Bird); 32 or −349 or −1121

Year 96 BC was a year of the pre-Julian Roman calendar. At the time it was known as the Year of the Consulship of Ahenobarbus and Longinus (or, less frequently, year 658 Ab urbe condita). The denomination 96 BC for this year has been used since the early medieval period, when the Anno Domini calendar era became the prevalent method in Europe for naming years.

== Events ==
=== By place ===
==== Roman Republic ====
- Consuls: Gaius Cassius Longinus and Gnaeus Domitius Ahenobarbus
- Cyrene is left to the people of the Roman Republic by its ruler Ptolemy Apion.

==== Greece ====
- Seleucus VI Epiphanes becomes king of the Seleucid Empire following the death of his father Antiochus VIII Grypus, and defeating in battle Antiochus IX Cyzicenus.

==== Asia ====
- Start of the Taishi era in the Han dynasty.

== Births ==
- Galeria Copiola, Roman dancer d. 9 AD

== Deaths ==
- Antiochus VIII Grypus, king of the Seleucid Empire
- Antiochus IX Cyzicenus, king of the Seleucid Empire
- Gongsun Ao, Chinese general of the Han dynasty
- Ptolemy Apion, king of Cyrenaica (modern Libya)
