= 36 BC =

7777 BC in various calendars
- Gregorian calendar: 7777 BC; V̅MMDCCLXXVII BC
- Assyrian calendar: −3026
- Balinese saka calendar: N/A
- Bengali calendar: −8370 – −8369
- Berber calendar: −6826
- Buddhist calendar: −7232
- Burmese calendar: −8414
- Byzantine calendar: −2268 – −2267
- Chinese calendar: 癸未年 (Water Goat) −5079 or −5286 — to — 甲申年 (Wood Monkey) −5078 or −5285
- Coptic calendar: −8060 – −8059
- Discordian calendar: −6610
- Ethiopian calendar: −7784 – −7783
- Hebrew calendar: −4016 – −4015
- Hindu calendars
- Vikram Samvat: −7720 – −7719
- Shaka Samvat: N/A
- Kali Yuga: −4676 – −4675
- Holocene calendar: 2224
- Iranian calendar: 8398 BP – 8397 BP
- Islamic calendar: 8656 BH – 8655 BH
- Javanese calendar: N/A
- Julian calendar: N/A
- Korean calendar: −5443
- Minguo calendar: 9688 before ROC 民前9688年
- Nanakshahi calendar: −9244
- Thai solar calendar: −7234 – −7233
- Tibetan calendar: ཆུ་མོ་ལུག་ལོ་ (female Water-Sheep) −7650 or −8031 or −8803 — to — ཤིང་ཕོ་སྤྲེ་ལོ་ (male Wood-Monkey) −7649 or −8030 or −8802

Year 36 BC was either a common year starting on Tuesday, Wednesday or Thursday or a leap year starting on Wednesday of the Julian calendar (the sources differ, see leap year error for further information) and a common year starting on Wednesday of the Proleptic Julian calendar. At the time, it was known as the Year of the Consulship of Poplicola and Nerva (or, less frequently, year 718 Ab urbe condita). The denomination 36 BC for this year has been used since the early medieval period, when the Anno Domini calendar era became the prevalent method in Europe for naming years.

== Events ==
=== By place ===
==== Roman Republic ====
- Consuls: Lucius Gellius Poplicola and Marcus Cocceius Nerva.
- Publius Canidius Crassus invades Armenia and Iberia (Georgia); he forces Parnavaz II into an alliance against Zober, king of Albania.
- June – Mark Antony launches a major offensive against the Parthians, in which he marches with 10 legions and 10,000 cavalry to Carana in Anatolia.
- July – Octavian's fleet (102 warships) embarks from Puteoli and tries to invade Sicily, but it is caught in a storm at Vibo and forced to return.
- August – Marcus Vipsanius Agrippa, an admiral of Octavian Caesar, secures the Lipari Islands and harasses the coast from Mylae to Tyndaris. Octavian transports his legions, via Leucopetra, to Tauromenium (modern Taormina).
- Antony crosses the frontier into Media Atropatene and commences the siege of Phraaspa. He establishes a line of circumvallation and builds siege engines.
- September 3 – Battle of Naulochus: Agrippa defeats Sextus Pompeius, a son of Pompeius, in a naval engagement off Naulochus. Sextus escapes with 17 ships to Messana and then to Asia Minor.
- Marcus Lepidus lands 12 legions from Africa and lays siege to Lilybaeum. He loses his army to Octavian when his men mutiny. Lepidus is kept in luxurious captivity in Rome until his death.
- Agrippa receives the unprecedented honor of a Naval Crown (corona navalis), wrought of gold and decorated with the prows of ships.
- October – Antony abandons the siege of Phraaspa (near Maragheh, Iran). He retreats, loses many men to disease and starvation in the subsequent retreat to Egypt, and marries Cleopatra VII while still married to Octavia.
- Judea: Aristobulus III, the last of the Hasmoneans, becomes High Priest in Jerusalem, replacing Ananelus, who has only held the position for one year.

==== Asia ====
- October–December – The Han dynasty Chinese army under General Chen Tang and General Gan Yanshou defeat the Xiongnu leader Zhizhi Chanyu in the Battle of Zhizhi. This leads to half a century of peace between the Han dynasty and the Xiongnu until Wang Mang enrages them in the year AD 10, resuming hostilities between both sides.

== Births ==
- January 31 – Antonia Minor, daughter of Mark Antony and Octavia Minor, mother of the emperor Claudius
- Ptolemy Philadelphus, son of Cleopatra VII of Egypt and Mark Antony (d. 29 BC)
- Vipsania Agrippina, daughter of Marcus Vipsanius Agrippa and Pomponia Caecilia Attica (d. AD 20)

== Deaths ==
- Ariarathes X (or Eusebes Philadelphos), king of Cappadocia
- Aristobulus III, high priest of Jerusalem (Hasmonean dynasty)
- Zhizhi Chanyu, Chinese ruler of the Xiongnu Empire
