= List of Church Fathers =

The following is a list of Christian Church Fathers. Roman Catholics generally regard the Patristic period to have ended with the death of John of Damascus in 749. However, Orthodox Christians believe that the Patristic period is ongoing. Therefore, the list is split into two tables.

== Until John of Damascus ==
Church Father	Date of death	Notes
Adrian the monk of Antioch	5th Century (estimate)	wrote a manual on the Antiochene method of Scriptural exegesis
Agrippa Castor	2nd century	
Alexander of Alexandria	326 or 328	
Alexander of Jerusalem	251	
Alexander of Lycopolis	4th century	
Ambrose of Milan	397	one of the Four Great Doctors of the Western Church; strongly opposed Arianism
Ammonius of Alexandria	3rd century	
Amphilochius of Iconium	403 or earlier	
Ananias of Shirak	685	wrote a work on Christmas and one on Easter
Anastasius of Sinai	7th century	
Andrew of Caesarea	637	commented on the Apocalypse
Andrew of Crete	712, 726, or 740	author of the 250-strophe Great Canon
Anthony the Great	356	
Aphraates	345	Mesopotamian bishop who authored 23 homilies
Apollinaris of Hierapolis	between 177-180	
Apollinaris of Laodicea	382	
Apollinaris the Elder	4th century	
Apollonius of Ephesus	after 210	
Apringius of Beja	6th century	commented on the Apocalypse
Archelaus (bishop of Carrhae)	3rd century (early)	supposedly a bishop of Carchar who wrote against Manichaeism
Aristides the Athenian	134	
Aristo of Pella	160	
Arnobius of Sicca	330	author of Against the Heathen
Arnobius the Younger	460	
Arsenius the Great	445	
Asterius of Amasea	410	wrote sermons on morality including topics like divorce and covetousness, and the parables of Jesus Christ
Athanasius the Great of Alexandria	373	one of the Four Great Doctors of the Eastern Church
Athenagoras of Athens	190	wrote in defense of the resurrection of the dead
Atticus	420s	
Augustine of Hippo	430	one of the Four Great Doctors of the Western Church (Doctor Gratiae)
Aurelius of Carthage	429	
Aurelius Prudentius	413	commented on the Psalms
Ausonius	395	
Avitus of Vienne	518	author of the five-book poem De spiritualis historiae gestis; converted King Sigismund; combated Arianism
Barnabas	061	wrote a single Epistle
Barsanuphius of Palestine	540	
Basil the Great of Caesarea	379	one of the Four Great Doctors of the Eastern Church and one of the Three Holy Hierarchs; father of monachism
Bede	735	Doctor of the Church and author of Ecclesiastical History of the English People
Benedict of Nursia	547	best known for the Rule of St Benedict
Boethius	520s	author of Consolation of Philosophy
Braulio of Zaragoza	651	commented on the Psalms
Caesarius of Arles	542	commented on the Apocalypse
Caius	3rd century	
Cassiodorus	585	
Chromatius	407	wrote sermons on the Gospel of Matthew
Clement of Alexandria	215	
Clement of Rome	099	
Coelius Sedulius	5th century	
Columba of Iona	597	
Commodianus	3rd century	
Cyprian of Carthage	258	
Cyril of Alexandria	444	Doctor of the Church (Doctor Incarnationis) combated the Nestorian heresy
Cyril of Jerusalem	386	Doctor of the Church who wrote thorough instructions to catechumens and baptized Christians
Pope Damasus I	384	
Didymus the Blind	398	teacher of Jerome and Rufinus; follower of Origen; opponent of Arianism and the Macedonian heresy; works condemned at the Fifth Ecumenical Council and the Sixth Ecumenical Council
Diodore of Tarsus	390	
Dionysius of Corinth	2nd century	
Pope Dionysius of Rome	268	combated Sabellianism
Dionysius the Areopagite	096	Secular scholars attribute writings in his name to Pseudo-Dionysius.
Pope Dionysius the Great of Alexandria	265	
Ephrem the Syrian	373	Doctor of the Church
Epiphanius of Salamis	403	friend of Jerome who strongly opposed Origenism and wrote a history of heresies
Eucherius of Lyon	449	
Eugippius	535	
Eusebius of Caesarea	339	
Eusebius of Emesa	360	commented on Genesis
Eusebius of Vercelli	371	
Firmilian	269	
Fulgentius of Ruspe	527 or 533	
Gaius Marius Victorinus	4th century	combated Arianism
Gennadius of Massilia	496	
Pope Gregory I the Great	604	one of the Four Great Doctors of the Western Church and author of Dialogues
Gregory of Nazianzus	389	one of the Four Great Doctors of the Eastern Church; one of three Orthodox saints honored with the title "The Theologian;" one of the Three Holy Hierarchs
Gregory of Nyssa	395	
Gregory of Tours	594	
Gregory Thaumaturgus	270	
Hegesippus of Palestine	180	a Jewish convert who combated Gnosticism and Marcionism
Hermias	3rd century	
Hesychius of Jerusalem	5th century	
Hilary of Poitiers	367	Doctor of the Church
Hippolytus of Rome	235	
Ignatius of Antioch	108	
Irenaeus	2nd (end of) or beginning of 3rd century	
Isaac of Nineveh	700	ascetic author of many spiritual homilies who commented on the Psalms and contributed significantly to Syrian piety; was not Christologically Nestorian
Isidore of Pelusium	450	author of 2000 letters dealing primarily with allegorical exegesis
Isidore of Seville	636	Doctor of the Church
Jacob of Serugh	521	a.k.a. Mar Jacob
Jerome	420	one of the Four Great Doctors of the Western Church
John Cassian	435	
John Chrysostom	407	one of the Four Great Doctors of the Eastern Church and one of the Three Holy Hierarchs
John Climacus	649	
John of Damascus	749	Doctor of the Church and author of An Exact Exposition of the Orthodox Faith and ascetic and exegetical writings and hymns; Peter Lombard based his Four Books of Sentences on the works of John of Damascus and Thomas Aquinas based his Summa Theologica on Peter Lombard's Sentences
Julianus Pomerius	between 499-505	author of De Vita Contemplativa concerning Christian sanctity
Julius Firmicus Maternus	4th century	
Justin Martyr	165	
Juvencus	4th century	
Lactantius	325	
Pope Leo I the Great	461	Doctor of the Church
Leontius of Byzantium	543	
Lucian of Antioch	312	
Lucifer	370	combated Arianism and defended Athanasius at the Council of Milan in 354
Macarius of Alexandria	395	
Macarius of Egypt	391	
Malchion	3rd century?	played key role in the deposition of Paul of Samosata
Marcus Minucius Felix	250	author of Octavianus
Marius Mercator	451	made a compilation on Nestorianism and another on Pelagianism
Martin of Braga	580	commented on the Psalms
Martin of Tours	397	
Mathetes	2nd century?	author of an Epistle to Diognetus
Maximus of Turin	465	
Maximus the Confessor	662	
Meletius of Antioch	381	
Melito of Sardis	180	author of an important sermon called On Pascha about the Resurrection of Jesus Christ
Methodius of Olympus	311	combated Origenism
Moses of Chorene	490	author of A History of Armenia
Nectarius of Constantinople	397	
Nemesius	390	
Nicetas of Remesiana	414	the patron saint of Romania commented on the Psalms
Nilus of Sinai	430	
Nonnus	5th century	
Novatian	258	commented on the Psalms
Oecumenius	6th century	author of the first extant Greek commentary on the Apocalypse
Optatus	4th century	combated Donatism
Origen of Alexandria	254	posthumously anathematized at Fifth Ecumenical Council (553)
Orosius	418	
Pachomius	348	Father of Christian cenobitic monasticism
Pacian of Barcelona	391	combated Novatianism
Palladius of Helenopolis	420s	
Pamphilus of Caesarea	309	
Pantaenus	200	first to make the Catechetical school of Alexandria famous
Papias	95-110	disciple of John the Apostle and Ariston
Patrick	5th century	
Paulinus of Nola	431	
Peter Chrysologus	450	Doctor of the Church
Pope Peter of Alexandria	311	
Philip of Side	after 431	
Philip the priest	5th Century (dates uncertain)	Acquaintance of Jerome, commented on the Book of Job
Philoxenus of Hierapolis	6th century	author of 13 ascetic discourses who combated Nestorianism, Manichaeism, and Marcionism
Poemen	450	commented on the Psalms
Polycarp	156	Wrote a single Epistle to the Philippians
Proclus of Constantinople	440s	
Prohaeresius	368	
Prosper of Aquitaine	455	
Pseudo-Dionysius the Areopagite	6th century	author of The Divine Names, The Mystical Theology, The Celestial Hierarchy, The Ecclesiastical Hierarchy, and the non-extant Theological Outlines; quoted extensively in the Summa Theologica of Thomas Aquinas
Quadratus of Athens	129	wrote a non-extant apology to Emperor Hadrian
Quodvultdeus	453	
Rabbula	435	ascetic and energetic bishop of Edessa and ally of Cyril of Alexandria who opposed the heretical teachings of Nestorius
Rhodon	after 192	
Romanus the Melodist	556	
Sahdona	649	commented on the Psalms
Salvian	490s	Gallic author of On the government of God
Severian of Gabala	between 408 and 425	commented on Genesis and the First and Second Epistle to the Corinthians
Severus of Antioch	538	
Sextus Julius Africanus	240	
Sidonius Apollinaris	489	
Socrates of Constantinople	439	
Sophronius of Jerusalem	638	
Sozomen	450	
Sulpicius Severus	425	disciple and biographer of Martin of Tours and author of an Ecclesiastical History
Synesius of Cyrene	414	
Tatian	185	
Tertullian	240	died a Montanist, First of the Latin Fathers
Theodore of Mopsuestia	428	commented on Acts of the Apostles and the First and Second Epistle to the Corinthians
Theodoret of Cyrus	458	continuator of Eusebius of Caesarea
Theodotus of Ancyra	5th century	
Theophilus of Antioch	Between 183-185	first writer known to have used the term Trinity to describe the Father, the Son, and the Holy Spirit
Theotimus	407	
Tichonius	390	commented on the Apocalypse; his seven principles of interpretation from his Book of Rules inspired Augustine of Hippo
Tyrannius Rufinus	410	friend of Jerome and continuator of Eusebius of Caesarea who commented on the Psalms
Valerian of Cimiez	460	commented on the Psalms
Venantius Fortunatus	600 or 609	wrote a poem on Easter
Victor of Antioch	5th century (late) to early 6th century	contemporary of John Chrysostom, commented on the Gospel of Mark
Victor of Capua	554	wrote the Codex Fuldensis
Victorinus of Pettau	303	author of On the Creation of the World and a Commentary on the Apocalypse of the Blessed John
Vincent of Lérins	450	
Zeno of Verona	371	
Pope Zephyrinus	217	commented on the Psalms

== After John of Damascus ==
Church Father	Date of death	Notes
Athanasius the Athonite	1003	
Gregory Palamas	1359	Pillar of Orthodoxy and defender of Hesychasm
Ishodad of Merv	9th century	commented on the Book of Job
Innocent of Alaska	1879	His The Way Into the Kingdom of Heaven is often used as an Orthodox catechism
Mark of Ephesus	1444	Pillar of Orthodoxy
Nicholas Cabasilas	1391	
Photius the Great	893	Pillar of Orthodoxy and author of Bibliotheca
Symeon Metaphrastes	10th century	
Symeon the New Theologian	1022	one of three Orthodox saints honored with the title "The Theologian"
Theodore the Studite	826	
Theophan the Recluse	1894	

== See also ==
- Ante-Nicene Fathers (book)
- Apostolic Fathers
- Cappadocian Fathers
- Church Fathers
- Desert Fathers
- Doctors of the Church
- List of early Christian writers
- Nicene and Post-Nicene Fathers
- Patristics
- Patrologia Graeca
- Patrologia Latina
- Patrologia Orientalis
- Three Holy Hierarchs
