= List of works titled De viris illustribus =

De viris illustribus (Latin, 'On Illustrious Men') is a literary genre found in ancient Roman, medieval and Renaissance literature.

Works titled De viris illustribus include:

- De viris illustribus (Cornelius Nepos), 1st century BCE
- De viris illustribus (Jerome), published in 393 CE
- De viris illustribus (Gennadius), a continuation of Jerome's work, 5th century
- De viris illustribus (Giovanni Colonna), 14th century
- De viris illustribus (Petrarch), 14th century
- De viris illustribus urbis Romae a Romulo ad Augustum (Charles François Lhomond), 18th century

== See also ==
- De scriptoribus ecclesiasticis (disambiguation)
