= De Viris Illustribus (Jerome) =

Collection of biographies by 4th-century Latin Church Father, Jerome

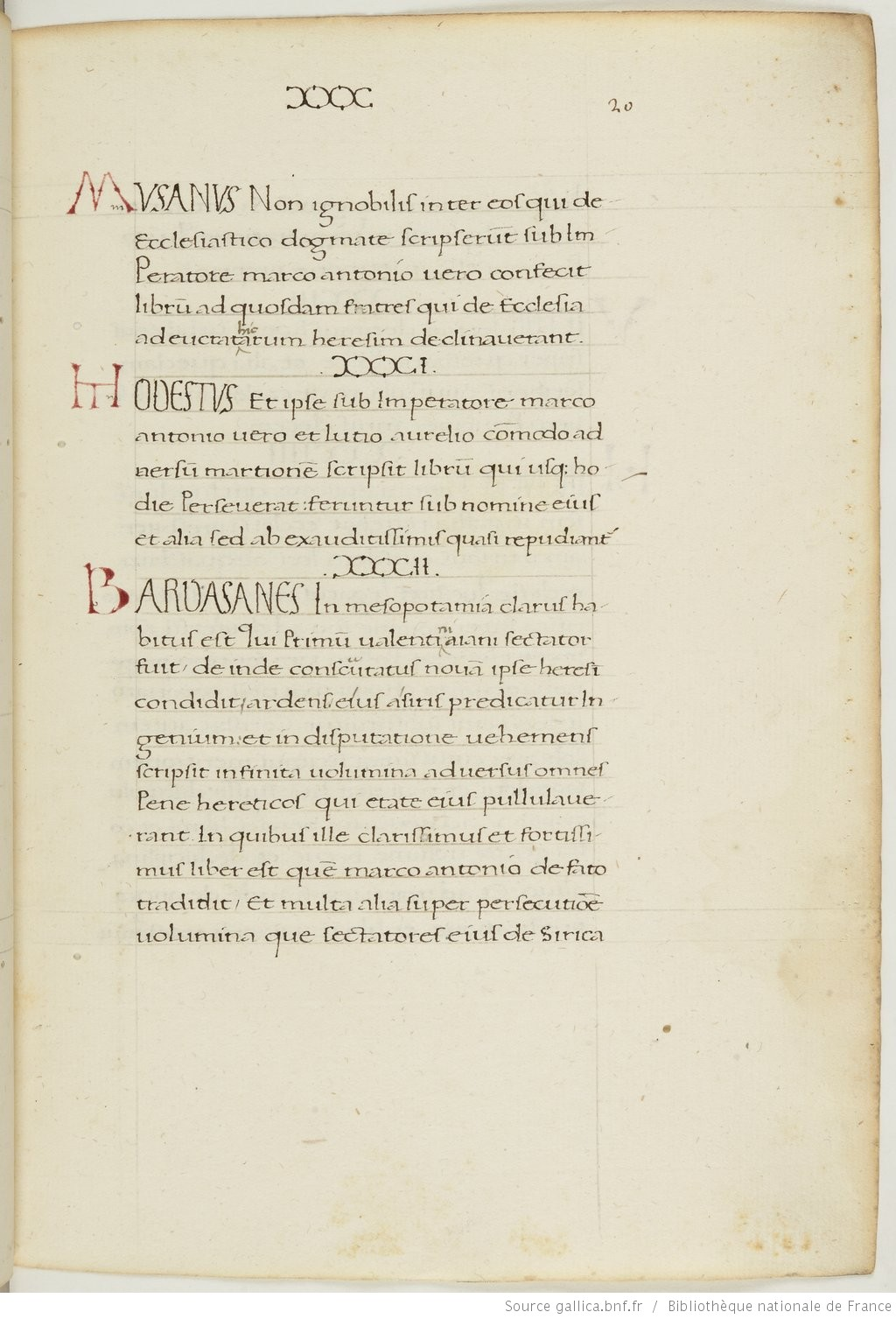
- Manuscript of the late 15th century, with this page showing entries for Musanus, Modestus and Bardaisan.
- Author: Jerome
- Translator: Ernest Cushing Richardson; Ernest J. Engler; Philip Schaff; Thomas P. Halton
- Language: Latin
- Genre: Biobibliography
- Published: AD 393
- Publication place: Roman Empire (Palaestina Prima)
- Media type: Manuscript
- Dewey Decimal: 270.1
- LC Class: BR60.F3 J4713
- Original text: De Viris Illustribus at Latin Wikisource
- Translation: De Viris Illustribus at Wikisource

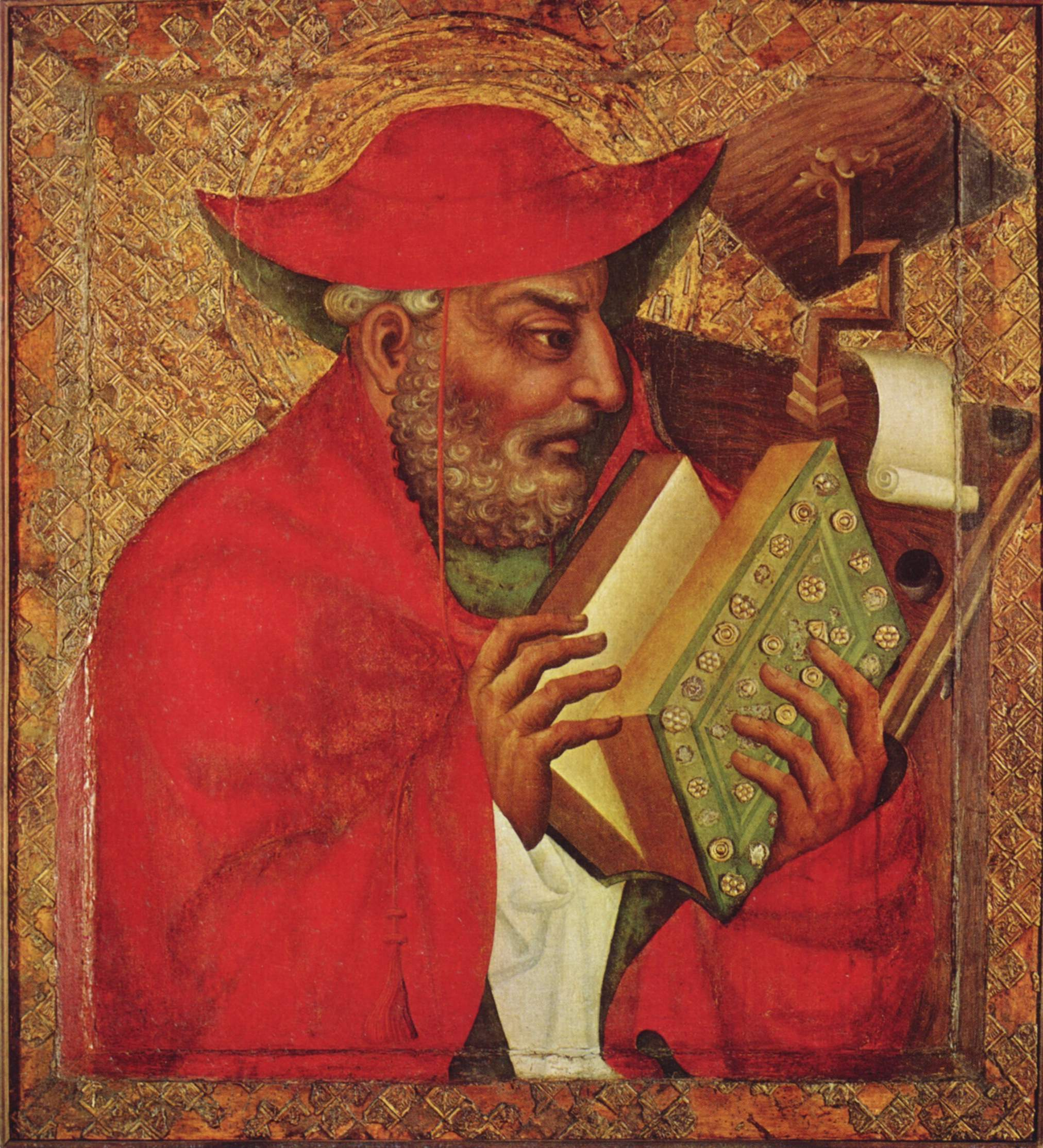
Jerome by Theodoric of Prague, c. 1370

De Viris Illustribus (On Illustrious Men) is a Latin biobibliographical collection by Jerome completed at Bethlehem in 392–393 AD. It consists of a prologue and 135 chapters, each giving a brief account of an author and a list of writings, beginning with figures from the apostolic age and ending with Jerome.

Jerome presented the book as a Christian counterpart to biographical catalogues associated with Suetonius and other classical writers, and much of the early material is taken with little alteration from Eusebius of Caesarea. The work was dedicated to the Roman official Nummius Aemilianus Dexter. In the preface Jerome casts the collection as an apologetic defence of Christian learning.

The text circulated widely. It was continued by Gennadius of Massilia and later by Isidore of Seville, and the three works were often copied together. Later scholarship has criticised it as rushed and incomplete, being flattering and insulting depending on the subject and Jerome's opinion of them.

== Composition ==
De Viris Illustribus was composed in Latin in 392 and early 393, after Jerome translated Origen's Homilies on Ezekiel and before he wrote his Commentary on Ezekiel. It was written during Jerome's first period of literary activity following his move to Bethlehem.

It was modelled after the works of earlier Greek and Latin authors. In a letter to Desiderius he wrote that he had "written a book on illustrious men from the apostles to our time in imitation of Suetonius and Apollonius the Greek." It reinvented a tradition of biographical collections used by Suetonius and Plutarch for a Christian world.

=== Purpose and dedication ===
De Viris Illustribus was dedicated to Nummius Aemilianus Dexter, the son of Saint Pacianus and a Roman official and a Christian who had encouraged Jerome to create a survey of Christian authors. SanPietro argues that this dedication was a pretext for Jerome to disguise his real intentions while Van Hoof argues that evidence for a close relationship between Jerome and Dexter is limited.

It was written as an apologetic work to demonstrate the accomplishments of prominent Christian authors, with Jerome including himself among them, at a time when Christian writing was seen as inferior. In the preface Jerome states that he aims "to do for [Christian] writers what [Suetonius] did for the illustrious men of letters among the Gentiles", reinforcing this a few lines later where he states his desire to create a collection similar to Cicero's Brutus, covering the Christian writers whose texts "founded, built, and adorned the Church".

=== Audience ===
The intended audience of De Viris Illustribus was the educated classes of the Mediterranean. Whiting describes it as a reference text for intra-Christian disputes, intended to "inform those who had no time to read extensively or had no thorough knowledge of Greek".

== Contents ==
=== Summary ===
De Viris Illustribus is a biobibliography covering four centuries of primarily Christian writers running from the apostolic age to Jerome himself. The first seventy-eight chapters are copied with minimal changes from Eusebius' Historia ecclesiastica, while the last fifty-seven chapters reflect Jerome's own research.

The entries vary in length, from brief notices to longer entries. They are all under 500 words long and follow a set pattern: the author's name, a short identification of their office or status, and a list of writings.

The notices are usually bibliographical rather than hagiographical, but some refer to hagiographic legends associated with figures already venerated as saints. Jerome uses the work to denigrate authors he did not approve of and praise those he did. He knew some of the subjects personally or had read their works, while others were virtually unknown to him.

The subjects are mainly Christian writers, with Jerome explaining his criteria as having "published anything memorable on the Holy Scriptures from the time of Christ's passing down to the 14th year of the emperor Theodosius". They are largely figures Jerome treats as reputable and orthodox, though he also includes authors he considers heterodox.

In the preface he describes the book as a catalogue of Christian men who were philosophers, eloquent, or learned, but he does not apply that description consistently, describing the writing of some authors such as Fortunatianus as "rustic".

=== Subjects ===
Listed below are the subjects of Jerome's 135 biographies. The numbers given are the chapter numbers found in editions.

1. Simon Peter
2. James the Just
3. Matthew
4. Jude
5. Paul
6. Barnabas
7. Luke
8. Mark
9. John
10. Hermas
11. Philo the Jew
12. Lucius Annaeus Seneca
13. Josephus
14. Justus
15. Clement
16. Ignatius of Antioch
17. Polycarp
18. Papias
19. Quadratus
20. Aristides
21. Agrippa
22. Hegesippus
23. Justin
24. Melito of Asia
25. Theophilus
26. Apollinaris
27. Dionysius of Corinth
28. Pinytus of Crete
29. Tatian
30. Philip of Crete
31. Musanus
32. Modestus
33. Bardesanes of Mesopotamia
34. Victor
35. Irenaeus
36. Pantaenus
37. Rhodo
38. Clemens
39. Miltiades
40. Apollonius
41. Serapion
42. Apollonius
43. Theophilus
44. Bacchylus
45. Polycrates
46. Heraclitus
47. Maximus
48. Candidus
49. Appion
50. Sextus
51. Arabianus
52. Judas
53. Tertullian
54. Origen
55. Ammonius
56. Ambrose
57. Trypho
58. Minucius Felix
59. Gaius
60. Beryllus
61. Hippolytus
62. Alexander of Cappadocia
63. Julius Africanus
64. Geminus
65. Theodorus (Gregory of Neocaesarea)
66. Cornelius
67. Cyprian of Africa
68. Pontius
69. Dionysius of Alexandria
70. Novatianus
71. Malchion
72. Archelaus
73. Anatolius of Alexandria
74. Victorinus
75. Pamphilus the Presbyter
76. Pierius
77. Lucianus
78. Phileas
79. Arnobius
80. Firmianus (Lactantius)
81. Eusebius of Caesarea
82. Reticius
83. Methodius
84. Juvencus
85. Eustathius
86. Marcellus
87. Athanasius
88. Anthony
89. Basil of Ancyra
90. Theodorus
91. Eusebius of Emesa
92. Triphylius
93. Donatus
94. Asterius
95. Lucifer of Cagliari
96. Eusebius of Sardinia
97. Fortunatianus of Aquileia
98. Acacius
99. Serapion
100. Hilary
101. Victorinus
102. Titus
103. Damasus
104. Apollinaris
105. Gregory of Elvira
106. Pacianus
107. Photinus
108. Phoebadius
109. Didymus
110. Optatus
111. Acilius Severus
112. Cyril of Jerusalem
113. Euzoius
114. Epiphanius
115. Ephraim
116. Basil of Caesarea
117. Gregory of Nazianzen
118. Lucius
119. Diodorus
120. Eunomius
121. Priscillianus
122. Latronianus
123. Tiberianus
124. Ambrose of Milan
125. Evagrius
126. Ambrose, disciple of Didymus
127. Maximus
128. Gregory of Nyssa
129. John the presbyter
130. Gelasius
131. Theotimus
132. Dexter
133. Amphilochius
134. Sophronius
135. Jerome the presbyter

=== Final chapter on Jerome ===
At the conclusion of De Viris Illustribus, Jerome provided his own biography as the latest example of the scholarly work of Christians. In Chapter 135, Jerome summarized his career to date:

I, Jerome, son of Eusebius, of the city of Strido, which is on the border of Dalmatia and Pannonia and was overthrown by the Goths, up to the present year, that is, the fourteenth of the Emperor Theodosius, have written the following: Life of Paul the monk, one book of Letters to different persons, an Exhortation to Heliodorus, Controversy of Luciferianus and Orthodoxus, Chronicle of universal history, 28 homilies of Origen on Jeremiah and Ezekiel, which I translated from Greek into Latin, On the Seraphim, On Osanna, On the Prudent and the Prodigal Sons, On Three Questions of the Ancient Law, Homilies on the Song of Songs two, Against Helvidius, On the perpetual virginity of Mary, To Eustochius, On Maintaining Virginity, one book of Epistles to Marcella, a consolatory letter to Paula On the Death of a Daughter, three books of Commentaries on the Epistle of Paul to the Galatians, likewise three books of Commentaries on the Epistle to the Ephesians, On the Epistle to Titus one book, On the Epistle to Philemon one, Commentaries on Ecclesiastes, one book of Hebrew questions on Genesis, one book On places in Judea, one book of Hebrew names, Didymus on the Holy Spirit, which I translated into Latin one book, 39 homilies on Luke, On Psalms 10 to 16, seven books, On the captive Monk, The Life of the blessed Hilarion. I translated the New Testament from the Greek, and the Old Testament from the Hebrew, and how many Letters I have written To Paula and Eustochium I do not know, for I write daily. I wrote moreover, two books of Explanations on Micah, one book On Nahum, two books On Habakkuk, one On Zephaniah, one On Haggai, and many others On the prophets, which are not yet finished, and which I am still at work upon.

Whiting argues that the entry functioned as a catalogue of Jerome's writings, allowing correspondents to request copies they lacked.

== Reception and influence ==
De Viris Illustribus circulated widely soon after its completion, becoming the most influential Christian biographical collection and defining a canon of knowledge that could be expanded and augmented. It was used as a reference work in intra-Christian debate but was criticised for including heretics, including by Augustine in 398.

The work was continued and revised, most notably by Gennadius of Marseilles in the fifth century and Isidore of Seville in the seventh, and the three texts circulated as a single corpus. It influenced later biobibliographical compilations and its material was repurposed in other contexts.

In the sixth century Cassiodorus recommended reading Jerome's work alongside its continuation by Gennadius. Bede, a Northumbrian monk, later treated its completion as a sacred event, writing "Jerome, the translator of sacred history, wrote a book about the most illustrious men of the Church".

By the ninth century collations of De Viris Illustribus and its continuations were used as lists in monastic libraries to check their holdings. McKitterick argues that the text was important in the formation and organisation of library catalogues and collections and contributed to a "book-based" way of thinking about the past while Whiting argues that it was used to help identify forgeries. It remained relevant even after many of the works covered by the text were lost, acting as a record of what had been written as well as what should be read.

The work continued to circulate in the twelfth century and was a model for a revival of the bio-bibliographic genre.

=== Modern scholarship ===
Modern scholarship has criticised De Viris Illustribus as rushed and incomplete, being flattering and insulting depending on the subject and Jerome's opinion of them, as well as self-aggrandising in the final chapter.

Kelly describes it as a "propagandist history" and criticises its reliance on Eusebius, arguing that Jerome at times misunderstood or mistranslated him. Langelaar et al. describe the intent as to "develop a Christian vision of history and to appropriate the past of the Roman Empire".

SanPietro argues that it worked to transmit orthodoxy, with Jerome creating it by working backwards from a list of works he believed should be included in Christianity's intellectual foundation.

== Editions ==
- Jerome and Gennadius: Lives of Illustrious Men, English translation by Ernest Cushing Richardson
- Jerome's De Viris Illustribus: Latin text (includes an informative introduction, in Latin)
- Jerome's De Viris Illustribus: Greek version
