= Modestus (apologete) =

2nd century Christian writer

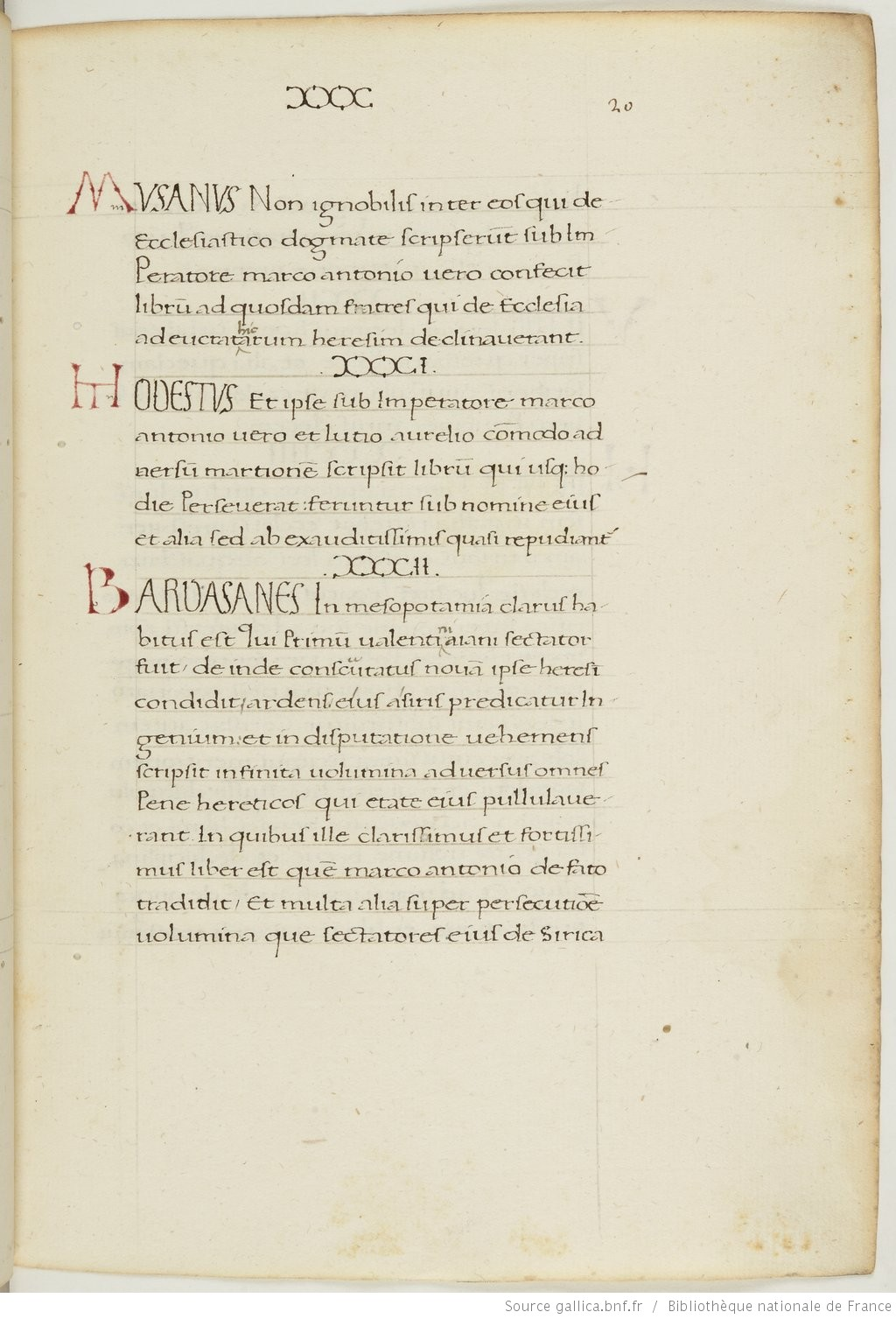
Manuscript of Jerome's De viris illustribus, the late 15th century, with a page showing entries for Musanus, Modestus and Bardaisan.

Modestus (fl. AD 180–190) was a Christian apologete of the 2nd century.

According to Jerome, Modestus wrote a work Adversus Marcionem ("Against Marcion") during the reigns of Marcus Aurelius and Commodus, i.e. c. AD 180. According to Eusebius, this work "exceeded all other confutations of that heretic."
