= Arabianus (disambiguation) =

Arabianus was a Christian writer of the 2nd century.

Arabianus may also refer to:

== People ==
- Flavius Arabianus, third-century praefectus annonae
- Gnaeus Claudius Severus Arabianus, Roman senator of the 2nd century
- Arabianus, 4th century bishop of Ancyra
