= Sextus =

Disambiguation page

Sextus is an ancient Roman praenomen or "first name". Its standard abbreviation is Sex., and the feminine form would be Sexta. It is one of the numeral praenomina, like Quintus ("fifth") and Decimus ("tenth"), and means "sixth". Although it is sometimes thought that these names originally referred to birth order and were then handed down through the family line, they may have also been a reference to the month of birth. Similar names were used among the Sabellians. The gens name Sextius is a related form.

Among those named Sextus are:

- Sextus Julius Africanus
- Sextus Appuleius
- Sextus Afranius Burrus
- Sextus Julius Caesar
- Sextus Aelius Paetus Catus
- Sextus of Chaeronea (nephew of Plutarch, he and Sextus Empiricus may be one and the same)
- Sextus Empiricus (he and Sextus of Chaeronea may be one and the same)
- Sextus Julius Frontinus
- Sextus Martinianus
- Sextus Tigidius Perennis
- Sextus Pompeius (younger son of Pompey the Great)
- Sextus Pompeius (relatives of Pompey the Great)
- Sextus Pompeius Festus (latter 2nd century), a Roman grammarian
- Sextus Pomponius
- Sextus Propertius
- Sextus Cornelius Repentinus
- Sextus Roscius
- Sextus Julius Severus
- Sextus Tarquinius
- Sextus Attius Varus
- Sextus, 2nd century AD theologian

== See also ==
- Bissextus
- Sentences of Sextus
