= Acilius Severus =

Acilius Severus may refer to:

- Acilius Severus (consul) (fl. AD 323–326), Roman consul and praefectus urbanus
- Acilius Severus (writer) (died between AD 364 and 375), Christian autobiographer
