= Heraclitus (disambiguation) =

Heracleitus or Heraclitus may refer to:

== Philosophers ==
- Heraclitus of Ephesus, pre-Socratic Ionian philosopher
- Heraclitus (commentator) (Heraclitus Homericus), commentator on Homer
- Heraclitus of Sicyon, author on stones
- Heraclitus of Tyre, friend of Antiochus
- Heraclitus the Paradoxographer, rationalizing author on Greek mythology
- Heraclitus the Peripatetic

== Poets ==
- Heraclitus (comic poet)
- Heraclitus (lyric poet)
- Heraclitus of Halicarnassus, elegiac poet

== Athletes ==
- Heraclitus of Macedon, winner in stadion Lykaia 304 BC
- Heraclitus of Samos, winner in stadion Olympics 208 BC

== Other ==
- Heraclitus of Cyme in Aeolis, governor of Heraclea appointed by Arsinoe II
- Heraclitus of Lesbos, historian on Macedon
- Heraclitus of Tarentum, harpist of Alexander
- Heraclitus (bishop), 2nd-century Christian bishop
- "Heraclitus", poem by William Johnson Cory, modelled on a poem by Callimachus
- Heraclitus (crater), a complex lunar impact crater in the rugged southern highlands of the Moon
- Heraclitus (modeling infrastructure), an approach for modeling computer-integrated systems
- Heraclitus (ship), a vessel built by Institute of Ecotechnics as one of several prequels to Project Biosphere 2
