= De scriptoribus ecclesiasticis =

De scriptoribus ecclesiasticis ("On ecclesiastical writers") is the title of many works:

- De viris illustribus, sive de scriptoribus ecclesiasticis (5th century), by Jerome
- De viris illustribus, sive de scriptoribus ecclesiasticis (5th century), by Gennadius of Massilia
- De viris illustribus, sive de scriptoribus ecclesiasticis (11th century), by Sigebert of Gembloux
- De luminaribus Ecclesiae, sive de scriptoribus ecclesiasticis (12th century), by Honorius Augustodunensis
- De scriptoribus ecclesiasticis (12th century), by Wolfger of Prüfening
- Liber de scriptoribus ecclesiasticis (1494), by Johannes Trithemius
- De scriptoribus ecclesiasticis (1613), by Robert Bellarmine
