= Kiss of Judas =

Kiss by which Judas Iscariot identified and betrayed Jesus Christ

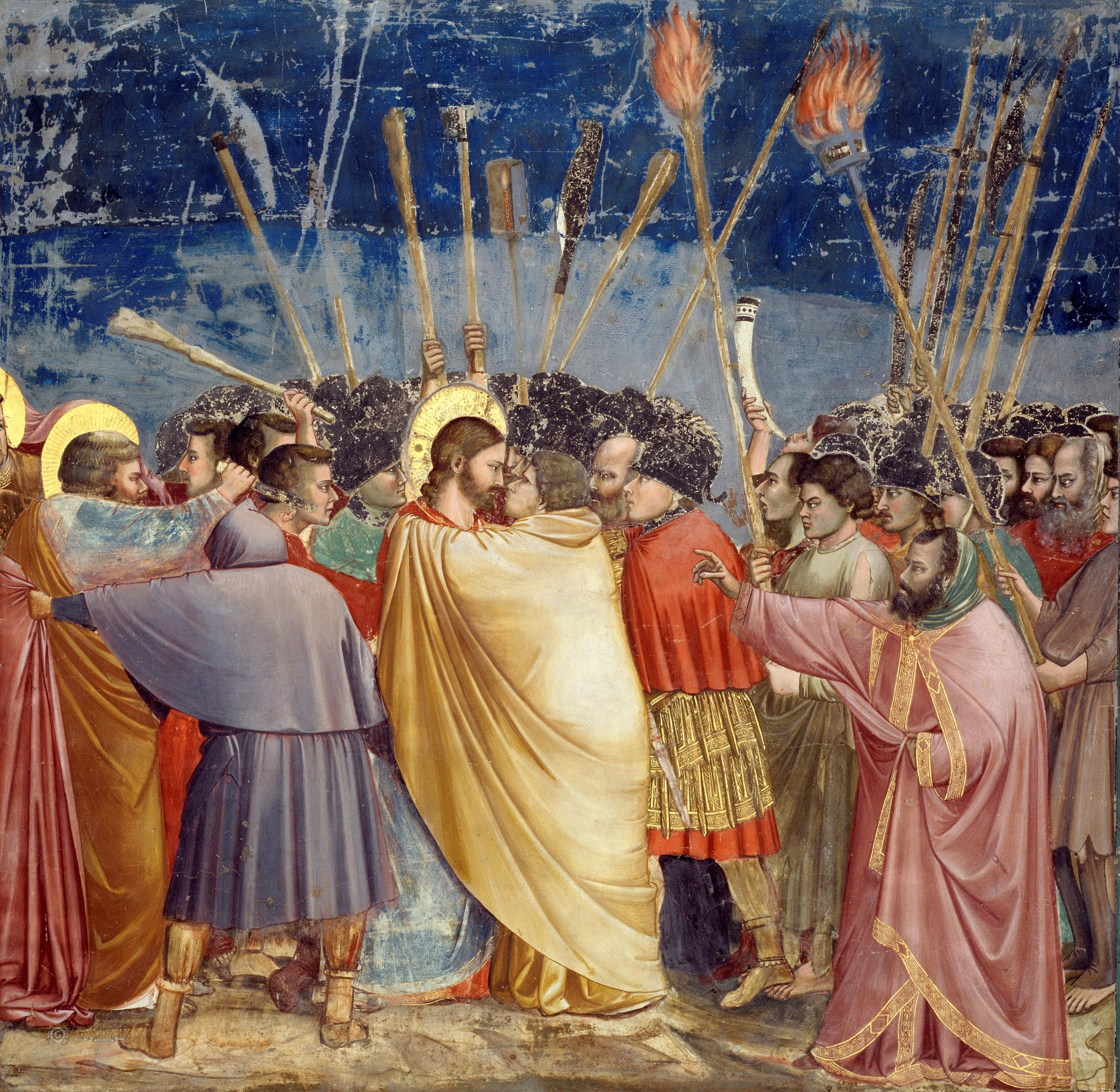
Kiss of Judas (1304–1306), fresco by Giotto, Scrovegni Chapel, Padua, Italy

The kiss of Judas, also known as the Betrayal of Christ, is the act with which Judas identified Jesus to the multitude with swords and clubs who had come from the chief priests and elders of the people to arrest him, according to the Synoptic Gospels. The kiss is given by Judas in the Garden of Gethsemane after the Last Supper and leads directly to the arrest of Jesus by the police force of the Sanhedrin.

Within the life of Jesus in the New Testament, the events of his identification to hostile forces and subsequent execution are directly foreshadowed both when Jesus predicts his betrayal and Jesus predicts his death.

More broadly, a Judas kiss may refer to "an act appearing to be an act of friendship, which is in fact harmful to the recipient."

In Christianity, the betrayal of Jesus is mourned on Spy Wednesday (Holy Wednesday) of Holy Week.

== In the New Testament ==
Judas was both a disciple of Jesus and one of the original twelve Apostles. Most Apostles originated from Galilee but Judas came from Judea. The gospels of Matthew (26:47–50) and Mark (14:43–45) both use the Greek verb καταφιλέω, kataphiléō, which means to "kiss, caress; distinct from φιλεῖν, philein; especially of an amorous kiss." It is the same verb that Plutarch uses to describe a famous kiss that Alexander the Great gave to Bagoas. The compound verb (κατα-) "has the force of an emphatic, ostentatious salute." Lutheran theologian Johann Bengel suggests that Judas kissed him "repeatedly": "he kissed Him more than once in opposition to what he had said in the preceding verse: φιλήσω, philēsō, 'a single kiss' (Matthew 26:48), and did so as if from kindly feeling."

According to Matthew 26:50, Jesus responded by saying: "Friend, do what you came for." Luke 22:47 notes that Judas "approached Jesus to kiss him," but does not say that he did so; in Luke 22:48, Jesus says "Judas, are you betraying the Son of Man with a kiss?"

Jesus's arrest follows immediately.

== In liturgics ==
In the Divine Liturgy of Saint John Chrysostom the Greek Orthodox Church uses the troparion Of thy Mystical Supper.., in which the hymnist vows to Jesus that he will "...not kiss Thee as did Judas..." (...οὐ φίλημά σοι δώσω, καθάπερ ὁ Ἰούδας...):

Τοῦ Δείπνου σου τοῦ μυστικοῦ, σήμερον, Υἱὲ Θεοῦ, κοινωνόν με παράλαβε· οὐ μὴ γὰρ τοῖς ἐχθροῖς σου τὸ Μυστήριον εἴπω· οὐ φίλημά σοι δώσω, καθάπερ ὁ Ἰούδας· ἀλλ' ὡς ὁ Λῃστὴς ὁμολογῶ σοι· Μνήσθητί μου, Κύριε, ἐν τῇ βασιλείᾳ σου.

Translation:

Of Thy Mystic Supper receive me today, O Son of God, as a partaker; for I will not speak of the mystery to Thine enemies; I will not kiss Thee as did Judas; but as the thief, I will confess Thee: Lord, remember me in Thy kingdom.

== Commentary ==
Justus Knecht comments on Judas's kiss, writing:

He did not refuse his treacherous kiss: He suffered His sacred Face to be touched by the lips of this vile traitor, and He even called him: "Friend!" "I have always treated you as My friend", He meant to imply, "why therefore do you come now at the head of My enemies, and betray Me to them by a kiss!" This loving treatment on the part of our Lord was to the ungrateful traitor a last hour of grace. Jesus gave him to understand that He still loved him in spite of his vile crime, and was ready to forgive him.

Cornelius a Lapide in his Great commentary writes,

Victor of Antioch says, "The unhappy man gave the kiss of peace to Him against whom he was laying deadly snares." "Giving," says pseudo-Jerome, "the sign of the kiss with the poison of deceit." Moreover, though Christ felt deeply, and was much pained at His betrayal by Judas, yet He refused not his kiss, and gave him a loving kiss in return. 1. "That He might not seem to shrink from treachery" (St. Ambrose in Luke xxi. 45), but willingly to embrace it and even greater indignities, for our sake. 2. To soften and pierce the heart of Judas; and 3. To teach us to love our enemies and those whom we know would rage against us (St. Hilary of Poitiers). For Christ hated not, but loved the traitor, and grieved more at his sin than at His own betrayal, and accordingly strove to lead him to repentance.

== In art ==
The scene is nearly always included, either as the Kiss itself, or the moment after, the Arrest of Jesus, or the two combined (as above), in the cycles of the Life of Christ in art or Passion of Jesus in various media. In some Byzantine cycles it is the only scene before the Crucifixion. A few examples include:

- Probably the best known is from Giotto's cycle in the Scrovegni Chapel in Padua
- The Taking of Christ by Caravaggio
- A sixth-century Byzantine mosaic in Ravenna
- A fresco by Barna da Siena
- A sculpture representing the Kiss of Judas appears on the Passion façade of the Sagrada Família basilica in Barcelona
The kiss of Judas in art

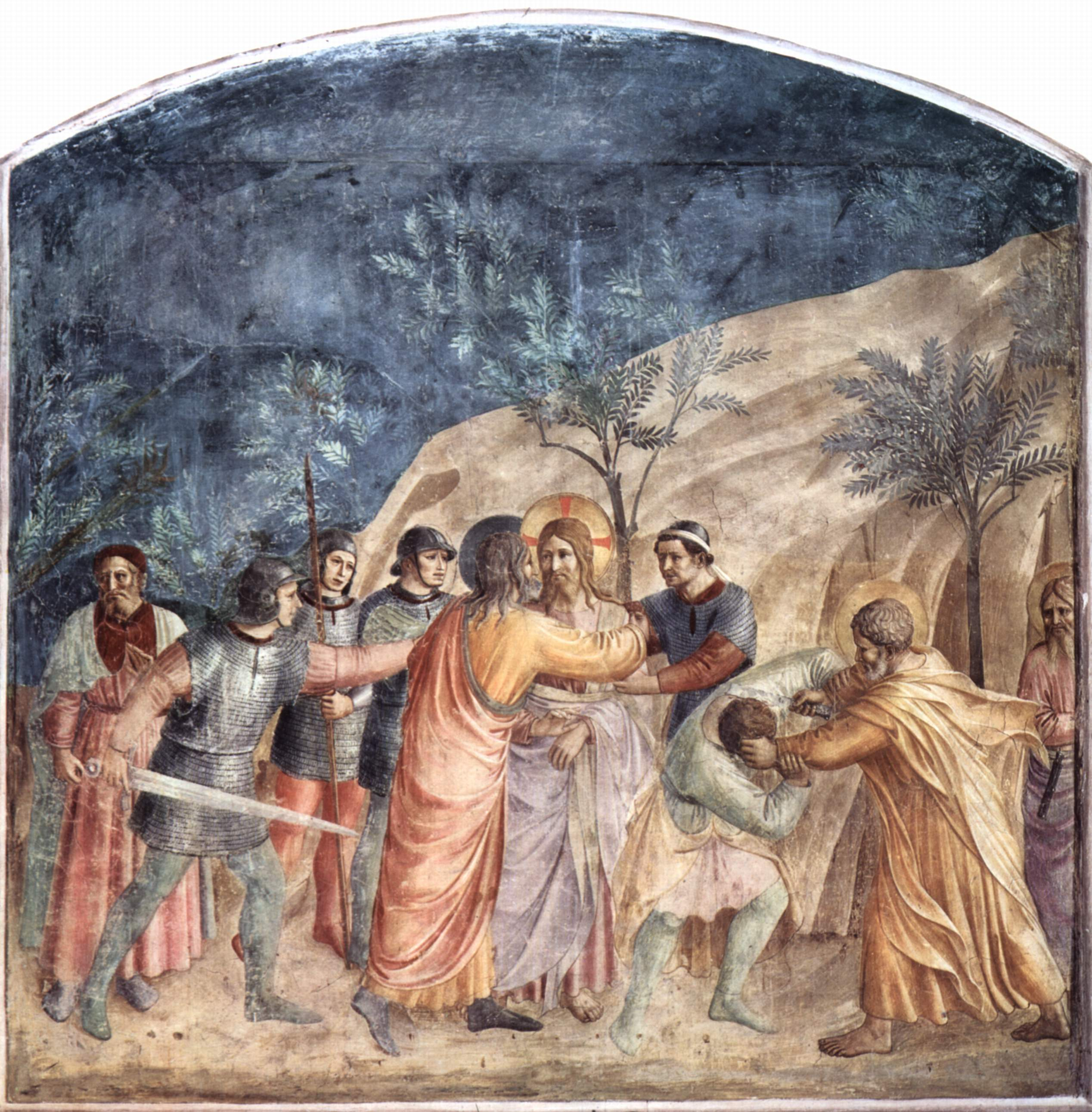
Fresco by Fra Angelico, San Marco, Florence, 1437–1446

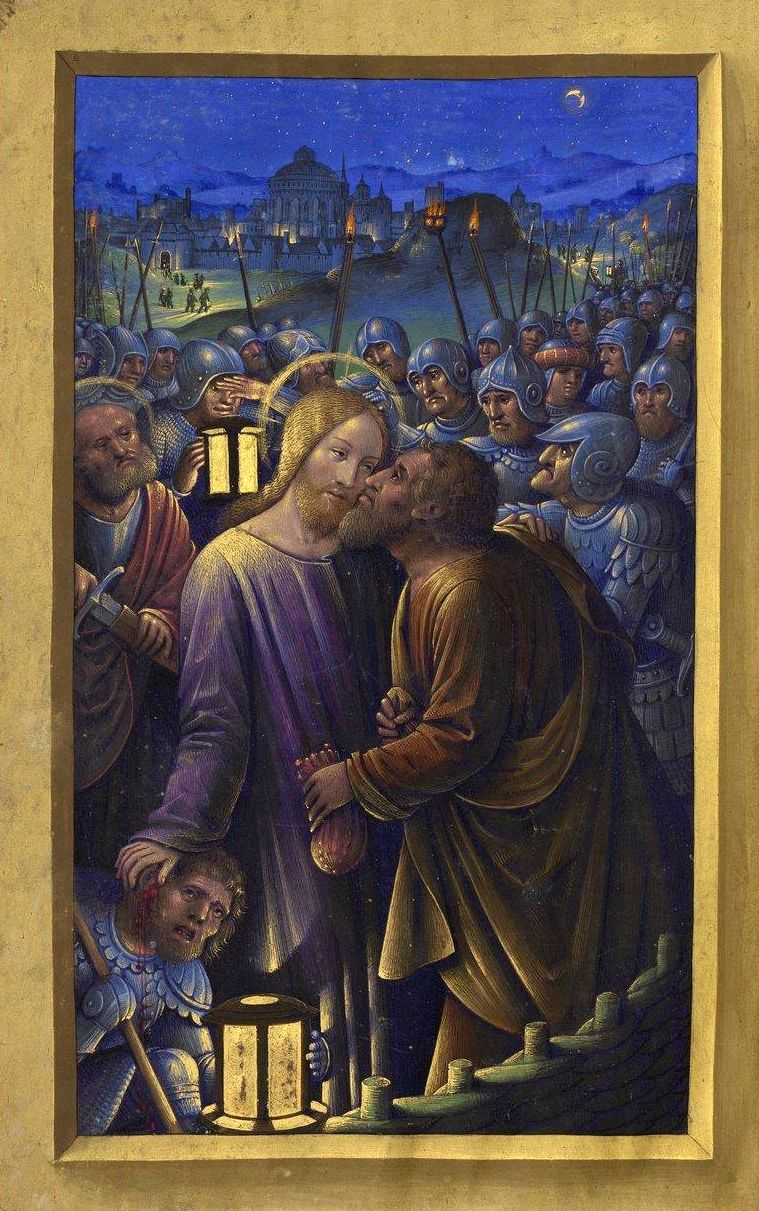
Judas betraying Jesus with a kiss, in the Grandes Heures of Anne of Brittany, between 1503 and 1508

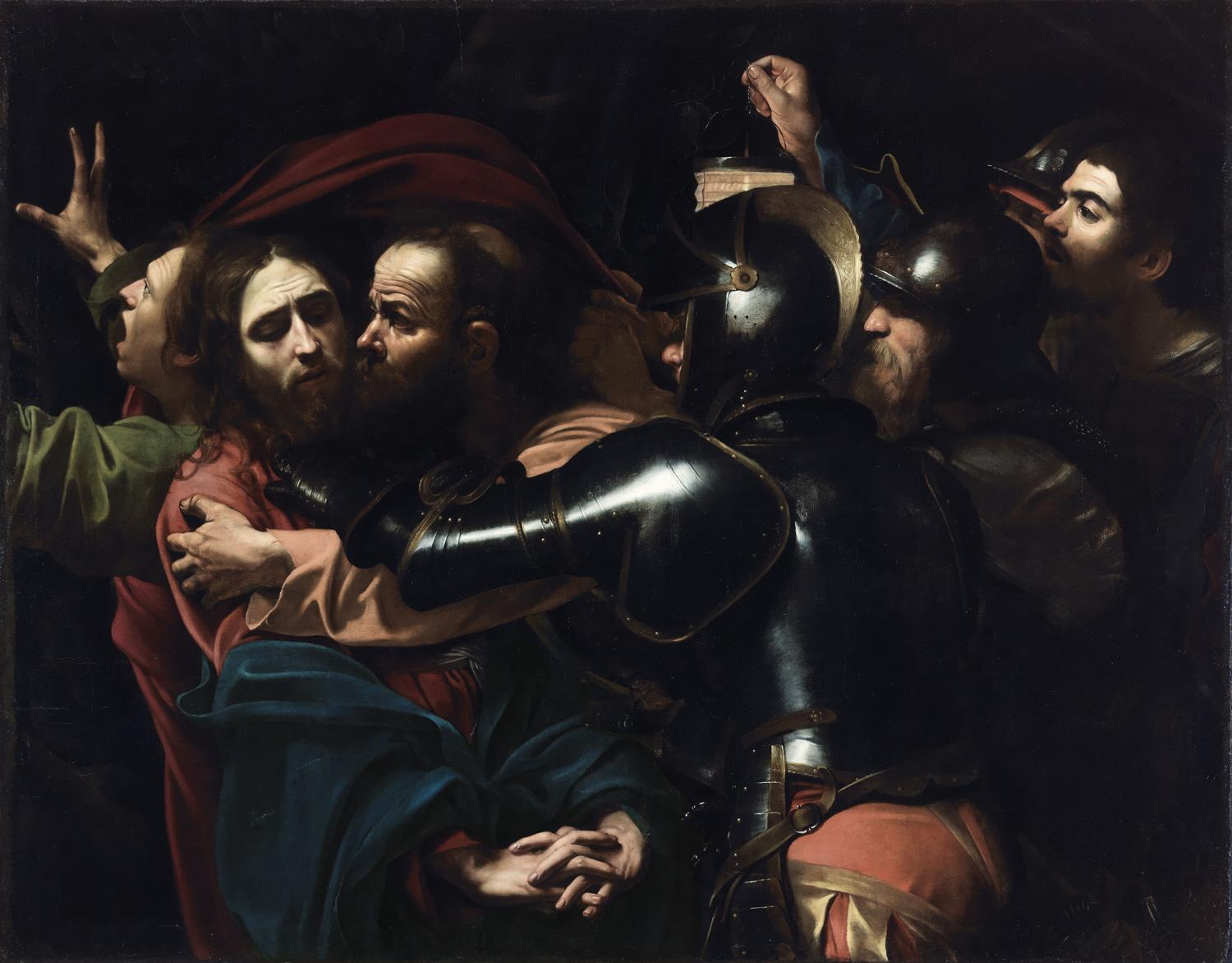
The Taking of Christ by Caravaggio, 1602

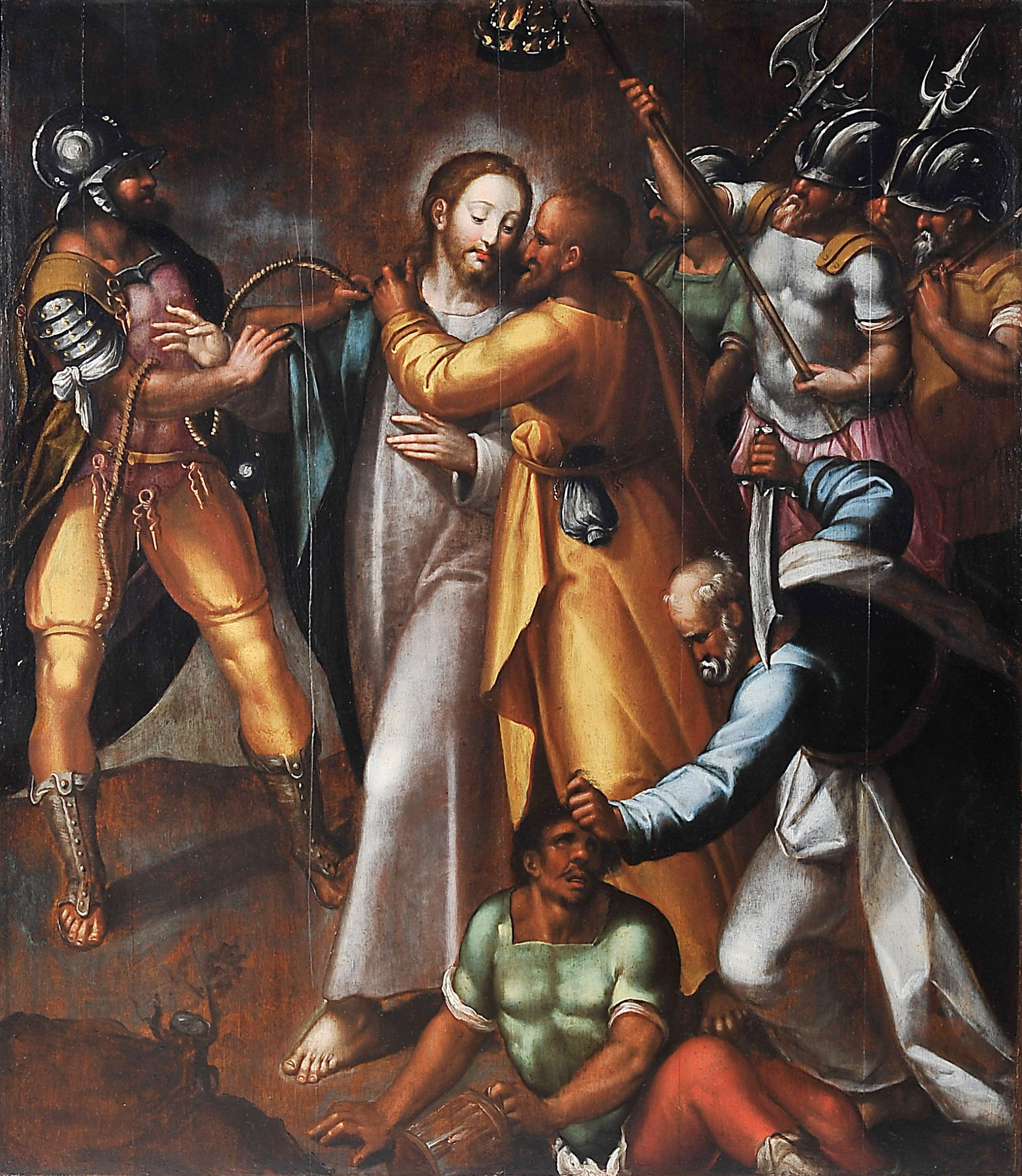
Beijo de Judas by Simão Rodrigues, Portugal, 17th century.

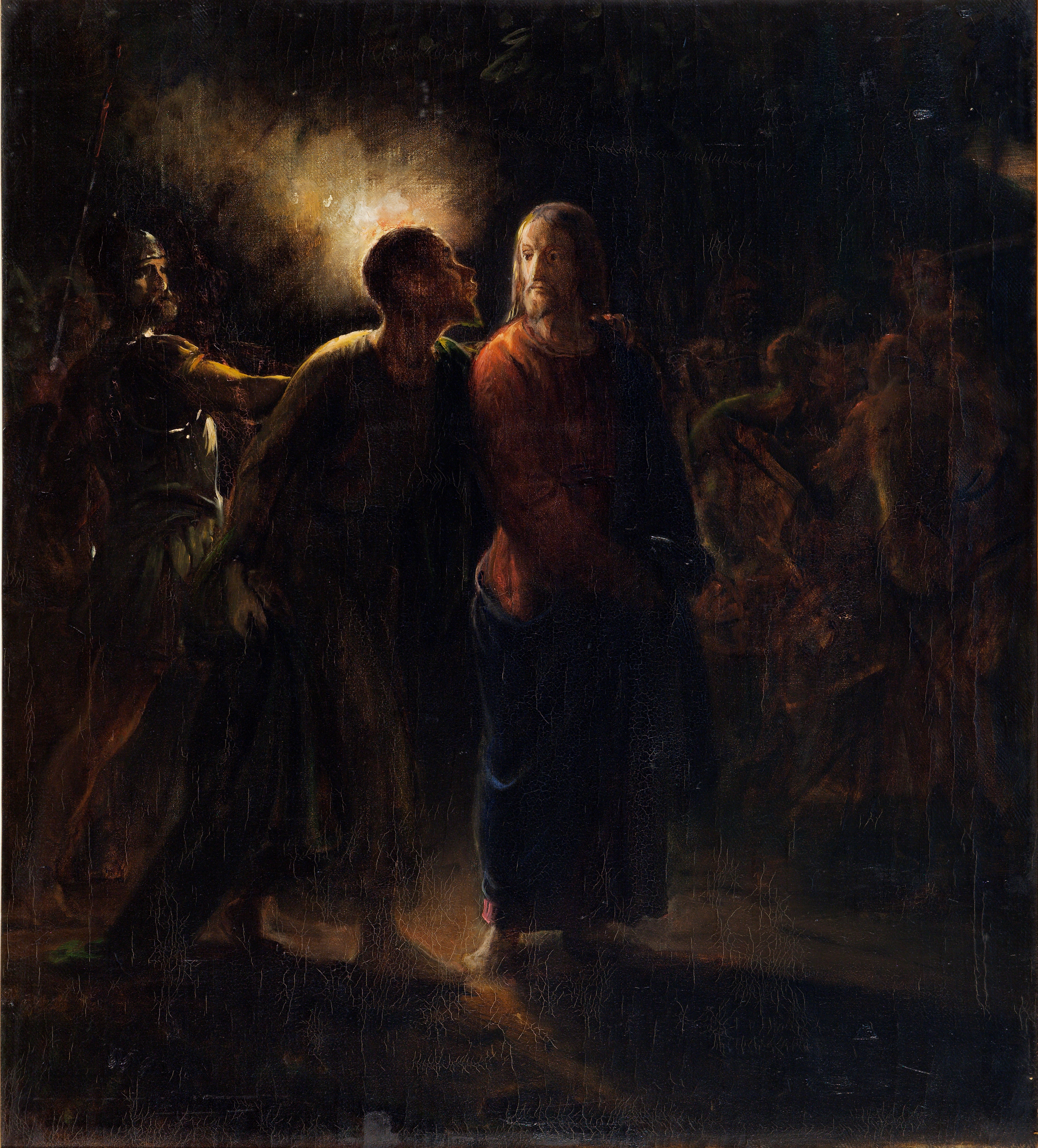
Wilhelm Marstrand, Kiss of Judas, undated (between 1830 and 1873)

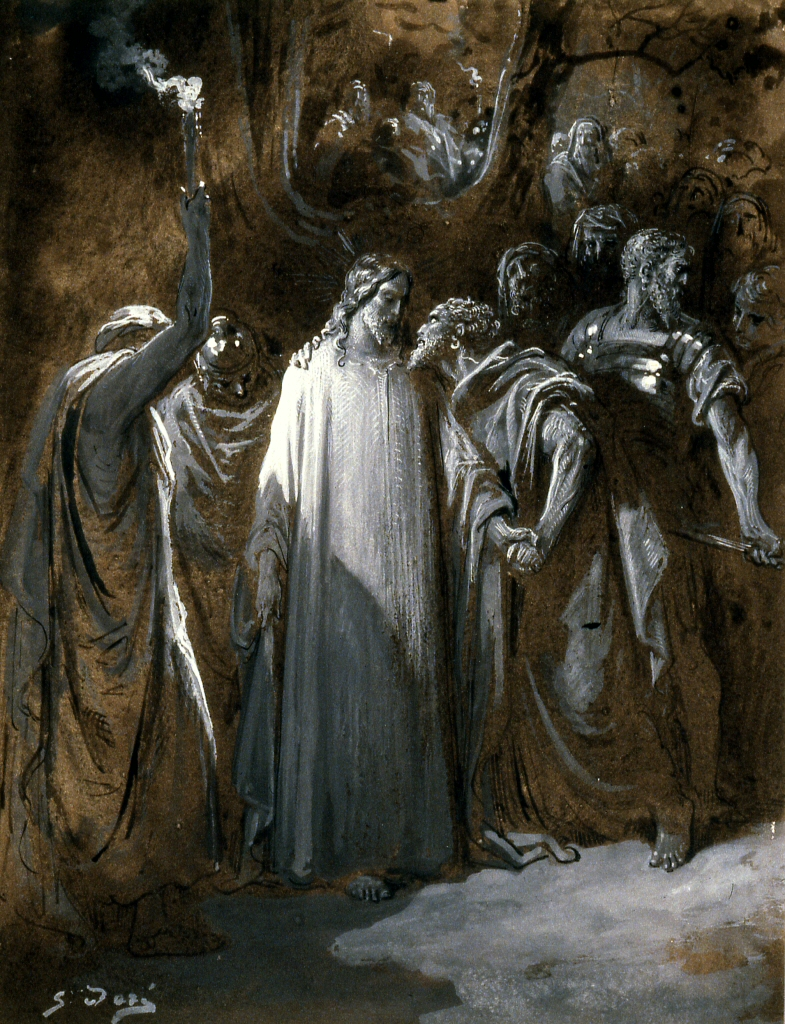
Study for The Judas Kiss by Gustave Doré, 1865

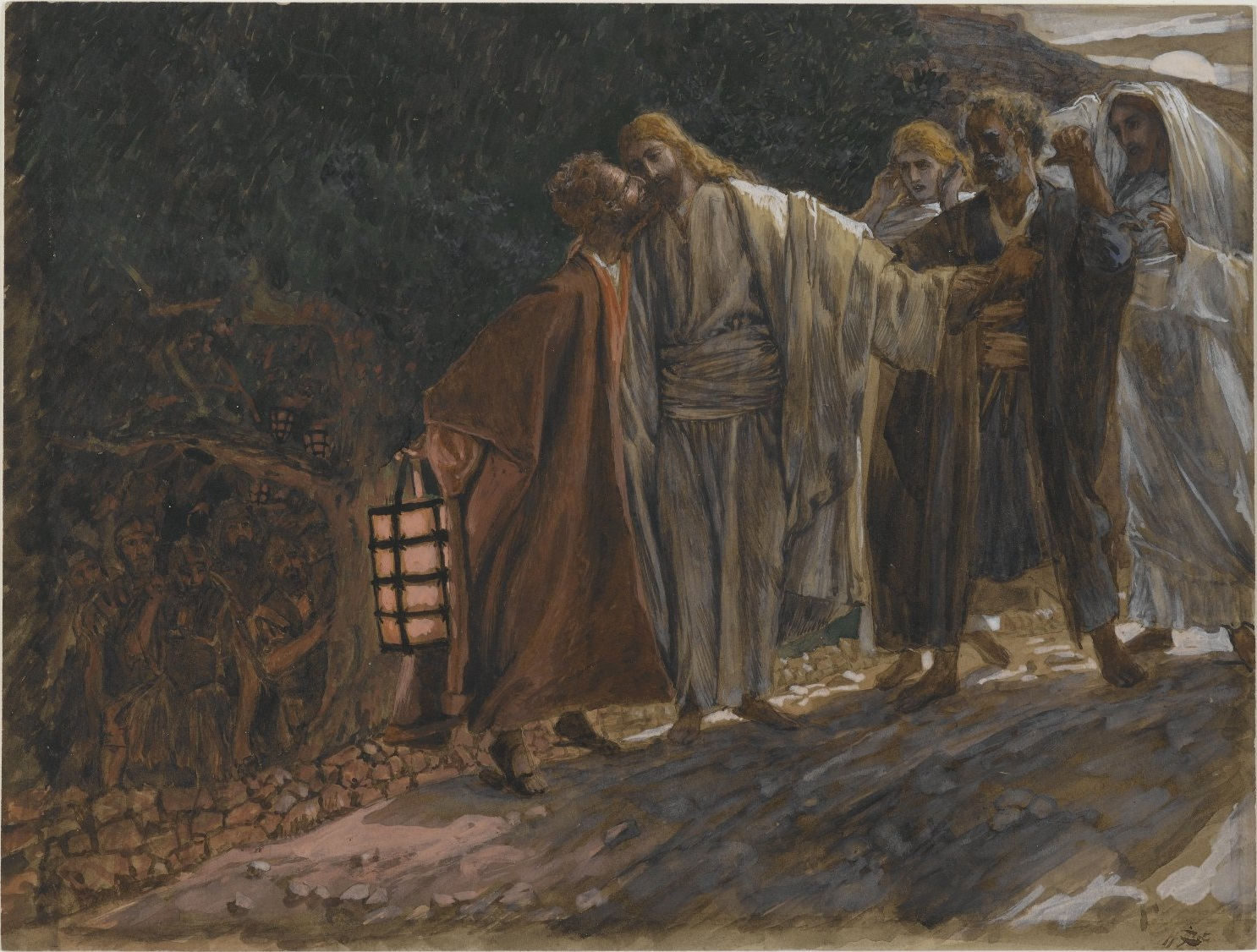
The Kiss of Judas by James Tissot, Brooklyn Museum, between 1886 and 1894

== See also ==
- Bargain of Judas
- Chronology of Jesus
- Gospel of Judas
- Kiss of death (mafia)
