= Latronianus =

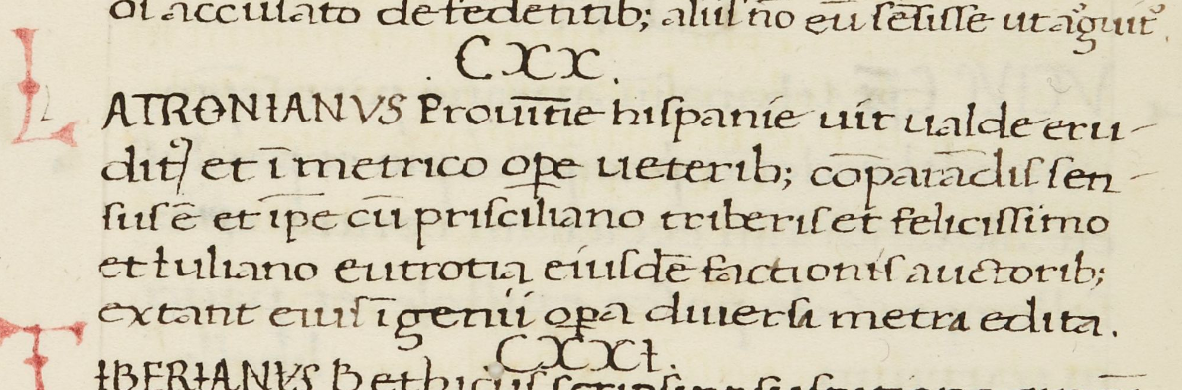
Entry for Latronius in a manuscript of Jerome's De viris illustribus

Latronianus (or Latronian; died AD 385) was a poet and scholar of Hispania (Roman Spain) who was associated with Priscillianism. He was executed, along with Priscillian and several others, at Trier in 385. As such, he is considered among the first to be executed as heretics in the history of Christianity.

Latronianus was noteworthy enough to receive an entry in Jerome's work On Illustrious Men (De Viris Illustribus), where it is mentioned that works of his were still in existence. Jerome describes Latronianus as "a man of great learning and worthy to be compared with the ancients as a composer in verse." However, none of Latronianus' works have survived to the present.
