= Pacian =

Bishop of Barcelona

Saint Pacian
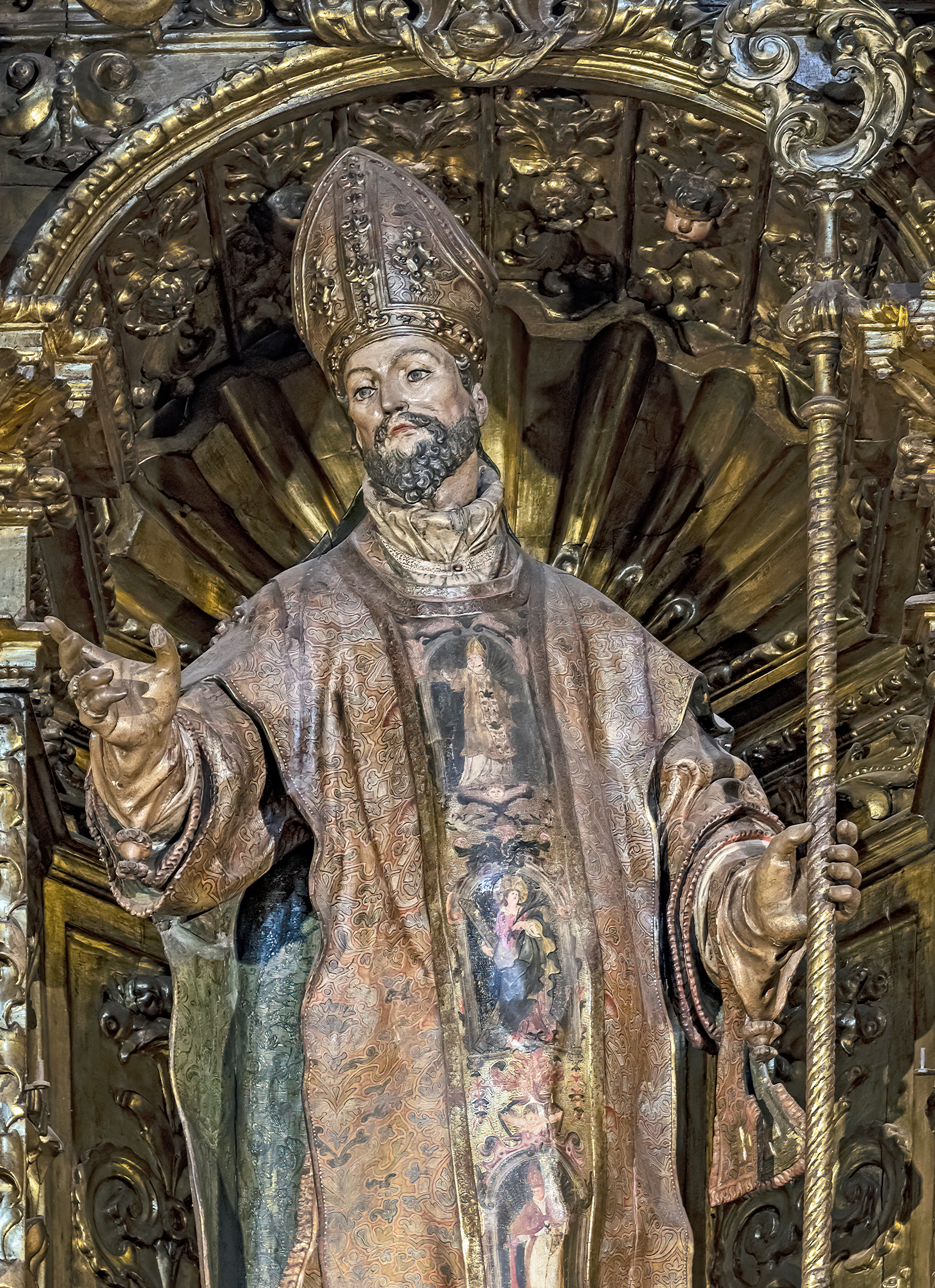
- Pacian of Barcelona by Joan Roig - Cathedral of Barcelona.

Church Father
- Born: c. 310 AD
- Died: c. 391 AD; Barcelona
- Venerated in: Catholic Church; Eastern Orthodox Church; Oriental Orthodox Church
- Feast: March 9

Saint Pacian (Pacianus) (Catalan: Sant Pacià) (c. 310–391 AD) was an early Spanish Christian prelate.

== Biography ==
Pacian served as Bishop of Barcelona from about 365 AD to 391 AD. He succeeded Praetextatus.

Considered a Father of the Church, Pacian is eulogized in Jerome's De viris illustribus, in which Jerome praises his eloquence, learning, chastity, and holiness of life.

His writings are extant only in part in three letters and a short treatise, Paraenesis ad Poenitentiam. In his writings, he discussed ecclesiastical discipline, baptism, papal primacy, and teachings on penance against Novatianism, which was then flourishing in Spain. He is also remembered from a phrase from one of his letters: Christianus mihi nomen est, catholicus vero cognomen ("My name is Christian, my surname is Catholic.").

== Personal life ==
Pacian was married and had a son, Nummius Aemilianus Dexter, who served under Theodosius I as proconsul and praetorian prefect. Jerome did not know Pacian personally, but knew Pacian's son, to whom De Viris Illustribus is dedicated.

== Legacy ==
In 2023, a study by Jesús Alturo i Perucho and Tània Alaix i Gimbert has seen the first hunches of Catalan in the writings of Pacian when he uses terms such as ceruulus 'cèrvol' or subinde 'sovint' or uses the expression si te placet for 'si us plau', among many others.
