= Appion (theologian) =

2nd-century Christian theologian

Appion (Greek: Ἀπίωνος, romanized: Apiōnos; fl. c. AD 196) was a Christian theologian of the late 2nd century.

In Jerome's De viris illustribus, he writes that Appion lived during the reign of Septimius Severus (i.e. late 2nd century), and that he wrote on the topic of the six days of creation. He is also mentioned by Eusebius for the same work. It is likely that the writing was directed against the theology of Marcion.
