= Trypho (theologian) =

Greek bible scholar

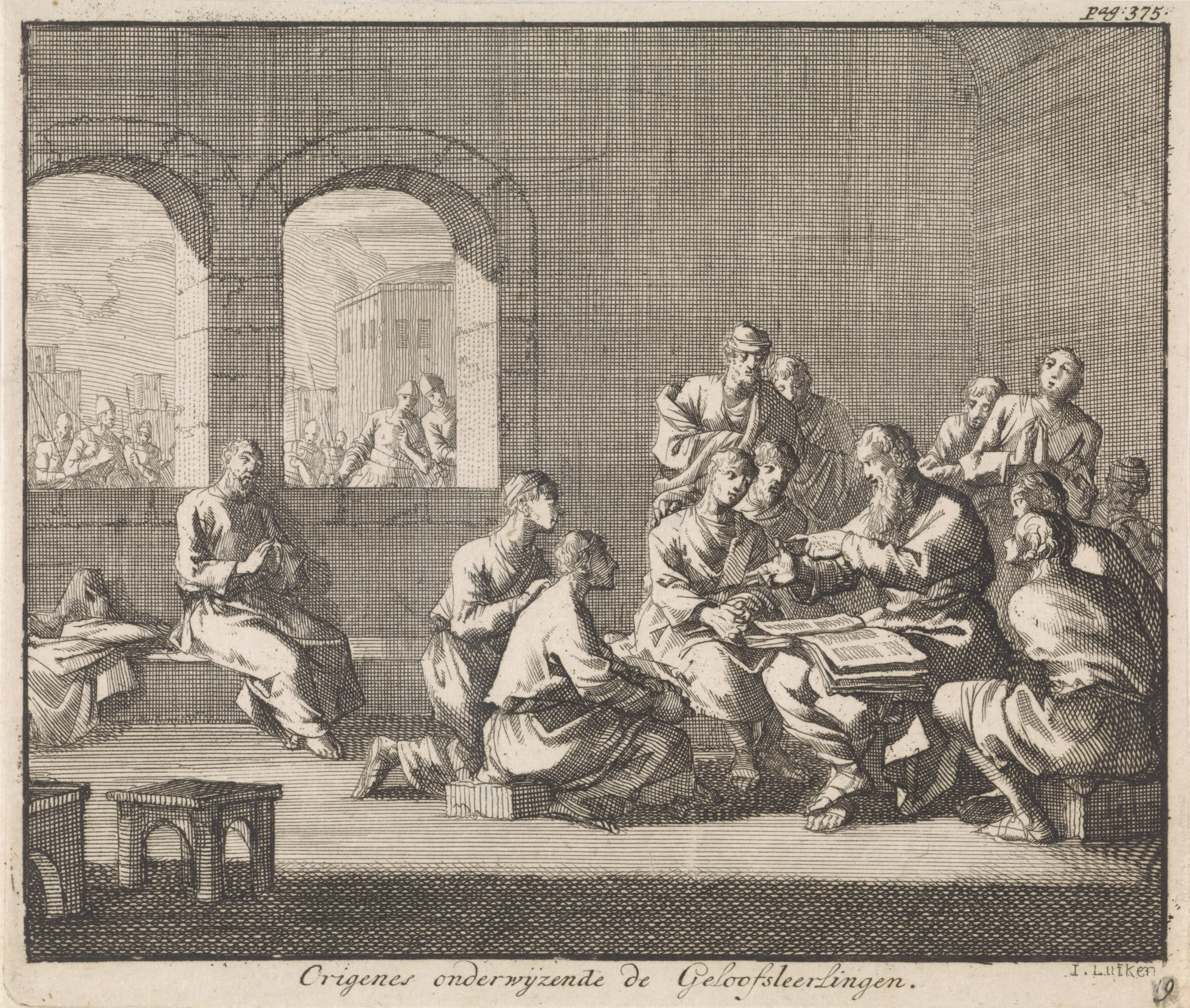
"Origin teaching the catechism to his students," 1700 etching by Jan Luyken.

Trypho (Greek: Τρύφων, romanized: Tryphōn; fl. c. AD 240) was a Christian theologian and Bible scholar of the 3rd century. He was a pupil of Origen.

In Jerome's De viris illustribus, he writes that Trypho wrote on the red heifer (Numbers 19) and about the sacrifices offered by Abraham in Genesis 9. He may be the same Tryphon as is named as a martyr in the Acta Tryphonis, who died in the Decian persecution of 249–51.
