= Jerónimo Román de la Higuera =

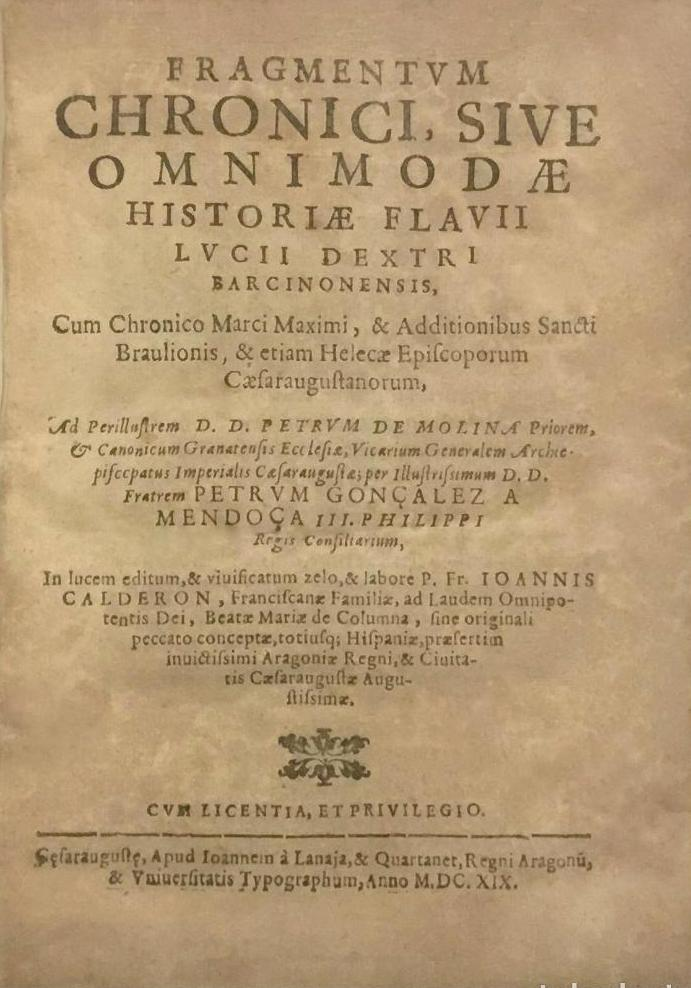
Title page of the 1619 edition of Higuera's forged chronicle attributed to Dexter

Jerónimo Román de la Higuera (28 August 1538 – 14 November 1611) was a Spanish Jesuit archaeologist, historian and forger. He is the creator of the so-called false chronicles.

== Life ==
Higuera was born in Toledo on 28 August 1538. His parents were María Álvarez Romano y Cuéllar and Alonso Fernández de la Higuera. He had a twin brother named Hernando, who died in Mariquita in Peru in the 1590s. Higuera studied arts and theology from the Royal University of Toledo, seemingly graduating with a doctorate in theology. He was ordained a priest and, in December 1562, entered the Jesuit order in Alcalá de Henares as a novice. He taught Latin grammar and the humanities in several Jesuit colleges in Madrid, Ocaña, Plasencia and Toledo and also served as a priest in Toledo and Murcia.

In 1590, Higuera took the fourth vow and became a Jesuit profeso in Ocaña. In 1594, he proposed, on the basis of a document he had recently discovered, that the remains of a building recently excavated by Juan Bautista Monegro on the site of a future hospital in Toledo belonged to a Mozarabic chapel dedicated to Saint Thyrsus (San Tirso). His questionable historical reasoning and his insistence that Thyrsus be recognized as a patron saint of the city and that the hospital project be shelved in favour of a new chapel made him many enemies in Toledo. One of his allies, Alonso de Cárcamo, the corregidor of Toledo, commissioned a play from Lope de Vega about Thyrsus' martyrdom. Higuera read it, but it was neither published nor staged.

Higuera died on 14 November 1611.

== Works ==
None of Higuera's writings were published in his lifetime. His works include:

- Historia eclesiástica de España
- Historia eclesiástica de la imperial ciudad de Toledo y su tierra
- Historia del levantamiento y motín de los nuevamente convertidos en el reino de Granada y algunos ilustres martirios que en ella padecieron algunas personas por la confesión de la Fee Catolica que fueron muchas en numero y sucesos de la guerra desde el año del Señor de 1068
- Historia de la casa profesa de la Compañía de Jesús en Toledo
- Defensa de las Reliquias del Sacro Monte de Granada
- Historia del colegio de Plasencia
- Historia del Colegio de Santa Anna y San Vicente martir, de la Compañía de Jesús que fundó el Ilustrísimo y Reverendissimo Señor D. Gutierre de Carvajal, obispo de la misma ciudad
- Discurso sobre si San Tirso mártir fue español y natural de Toledo

In 1594, Higuera claimed to have in his possession four chronicles thought to be lost. These works, attributed to Flavius Lucius Dexter, Maximus of Zaragoza, Liutprand of Cremona and Julián Pérez, were in fact forged by Higuera. They are known as the false chronicles in Iberian historiography. The chronicle of pseudo-Dexter covers the years 1–430. That of pseudo-Maximus covers the period 430–620. The chronicle attributed to Luitprand (as Higuera spelled it) he originally attributed to one Eutrand. It covers the period from the seventh to the tenth century. Although his first three forgeries were attributed to historical authors, the fourth Higuera attributed to an author of his own invention, a Mozarab named Julián Pérez, whom he presented as a contemporary of El Cid (d. 1099).

== Bibliography ==
- Burrieza Sánchez, Javier (2018). "Higuera, Jerónimo Román de la". Diccionario biográfico español. Real Academia de la Historia.
- Olds, Katrina B. (2015). Forging the Past: Invented Histories in Counter-Reformation Spain. Yale University Press. doi:10.12987/9780300186062.
