= Sophronius (theologian) =

Late 4th century theologian and translator

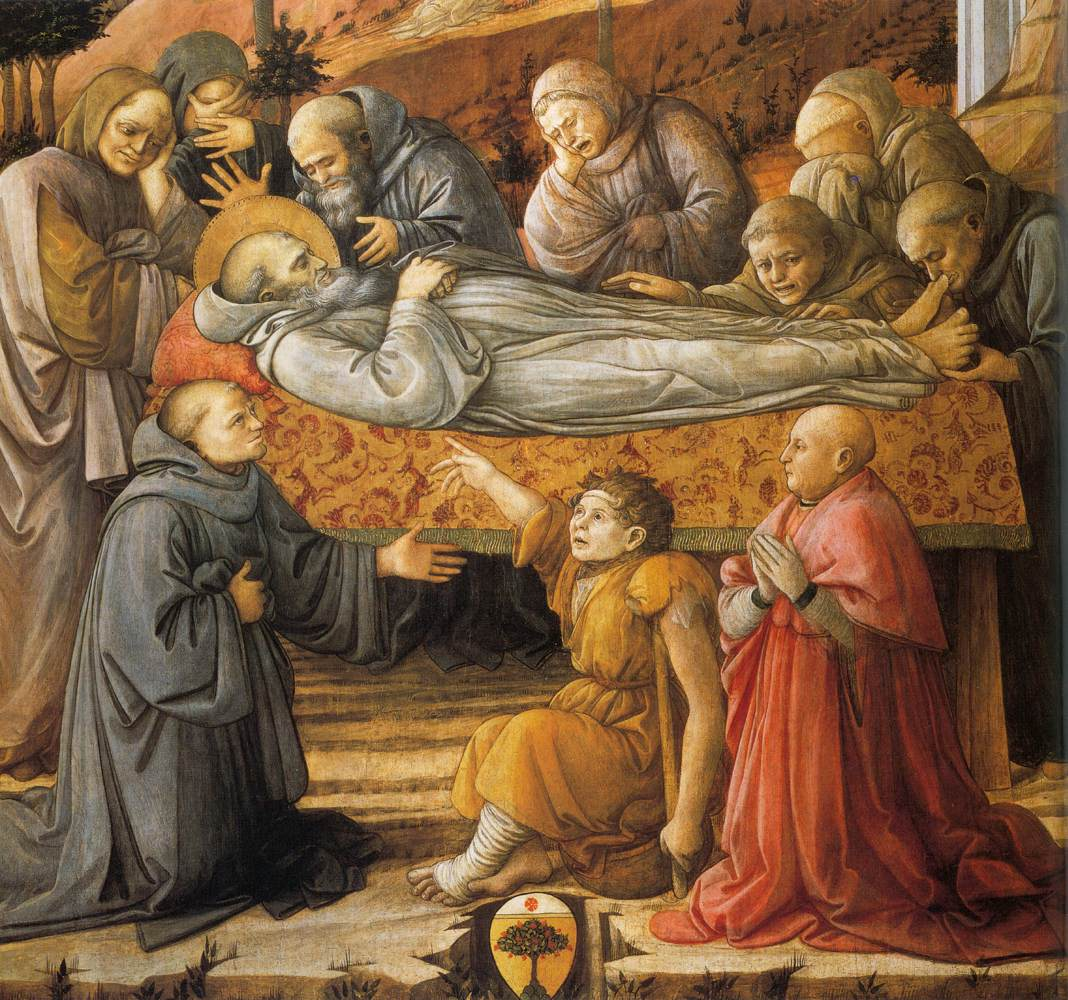
Funeral of St Jerome (detail), with his students and companions in attendance. (Filippo Lippi, c. 1460)

Sophronius (Greek: Σωφρόνιος, romanized: Sōphronios; fl. c. AD 392) was a Christian theologian and translator of the late 4th century AD, a friend of Jerome.

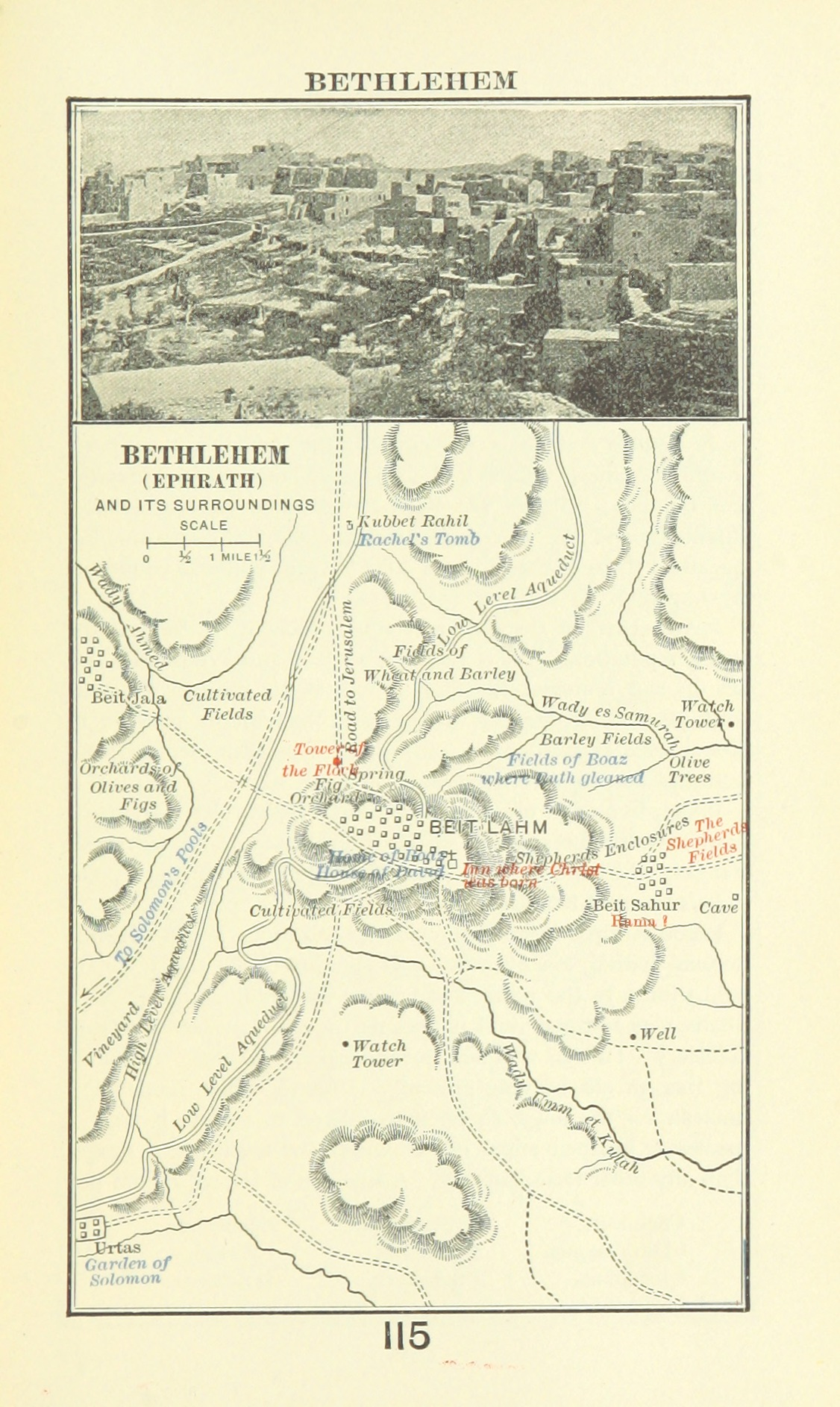
Map of ancient Bethlehem. Jerome's study was underneath the Church of the Nativity, marked on this map as "Inn where Christ was born."

In Jerome's De viris illustribus, he writes that Sophronius wrote "In praise of Bethlehem," which was Jerome's hometown; Of his country of origin, there is no certain information; it is known he had knowledge of Greek, Latin and Biblical Hebrew, and that he also lived in Bethlehem as part of Jerome's learned community. He also wrote:

- On the overthrow of Serapis, referring to the Graeco-Egyptian god Serapis whose worship was displaced by Christianity
- To Eustachius On Virginity (perhaps to Eustathius of Antioch, a zealous critic of Arianism)
- Life of Hilarion the monk, a hagiography of Hilarion (291–371)

He also translated some of Jerome's work into Greek. Jerome dedicated his Latin Psalters to Sophronius. In his De Viris Illustribus, Jerome mentions that Sophronius and he translated The Psalter and the Prophets from Biblical Hebrew into Latin together.
