= Nummius Aemilianus Dexter =

Roman historian

Nummius Aemilianus Dexter (fl. 380–395), often erroneously called Flavius Lucius Dexter, was a figure of the late fourth century, reported as a historian, and acquainted with St Jerome. He was the son of St Pacian, an imperial office-holder, and dedicatee of a work of Jerome, the De Viris Illustribus. He also served as proconsul of Asia under emperor Theodosius I (r. 379–395) and hold the position of praetorian prefect of Italy in 395.

Dexter was the supposed author of a chronicle, called the Omnimoda Historia or the Chronicle of Pseudo-Dexter. It was in fact a forgery, one of a number of Jerónimo Román de la Higuera's (1538–1611), who published a collection of false documents in 1594 attributed to "Flavius Lucius Dexter" (alongside "Marcus Maximus" and "Eutrandus"). The suspect authorship has been widely known since the work of the Spanish bibliographer Nicolás Antonio, the Censura de historias fabulosas, published in 1742. Doubts were already cast on these false chronicles before 1600, but controversy continued late into the eighteenth century. In the nineteenth century there were still references to the Chronicle as genuine, e.g. its inclusion in Volume 31 of the Patrologia Latina.

There is a second work attributed to him, In prophetam Danielis de quatuor animalibus ("Against the prophet Daniel on the four animals").

The real Dexter was the author of a genuine work known as the Omnimoda Historia (which St. Jerome refers to in On Illustrious Men 132, but claims he had not read it) but while historians are agreed that it is to be distinguished from the Chronicle of Pseudo-Dexter, the exact nature of the work is debated. Given Jerome's similar phraseology in reference to Eusebius' Chronicle, the work has been seen as either a continuation or translation of that work.
