= Geminus of Antioch =

Geminus of Antioch (fl. c. AD 230–240) was a Christian priest and writer of the early 3rd century AD.

According to Jerome in De viris illustribus, Geminus wrote "a few monuments of his genius" (Latin: pauca ingenii sui monumenta) during the reigns of Severus Alexander as Roman Emperor (r. 222–235), Zebinnus as Patriarch of Antioch (231/2–237/40) and Heraclas as Patriarch of Alexandria (in office 232–248). These works have not survived.
