= Judas (theologian) =

Christian theologian and historian of the early 3rd century

Judas (Latin: Iūdās, Greek: Ὶούδας, romanized: Ioudas; fl. c. AD 202) was a Christian theologian and historian of the early 3rd century.

In Jerome's De viris illustribus, he writes that Judas wrote on the Prophecy of Seventy Weeks in the Book of Daniel. He also wrote a chronography which ran up to the tenth year of Septimius Severus (i.e. AD 202). He believed that the Antichrist would come during his life, due to the persecution of Christians taking place at the time. He is mentioned by Eusebius in his Church History for the same work.

G. H. R. Horsley suggested that this Judas may have been a Jewish convert to Christianity, given the unlikelihood of a Christian of the era being baptized "Judas", and his expert knowledge of the Book of Daniel.
