= Theodorus (bishop of Heraclea in Thrace) =

Biblical scholar

Map of the Sea of Marmara in the Byzantine period; "Heraclea Perinthus" is visible at centre.

Theodorus (Greek: Θεόδωρος, romanized: Theodōros; fl. c. AD 328–355) was a Christian biblical scholar of the mid-4th century AD. He was bishop of Heraclea in Thrace (also called Perinthus or Heraclea in Europa; modern Marmara Ereğlisi), being appointed some time between 328 and 334; he was an ally of Eusebius against the Athanasians. He should not be confused with Theodore Stratelates (281–319), sometimes called "Theodore of Heraclea"; Theodore Stratelates lived in Heraclea Pontica.

In Jerome's De viris illustribus, he writes that Theodorus wrote the following works during the reign of Constantius II (r. 337–361):

- On Matthew and John (fragments of which survive)
- On the Epistles
- On the Psalter

He was deposed in AD 347 and died around 355.
