= Fortunatianus of Aquileia =

4th-century Bishop of Aquileia

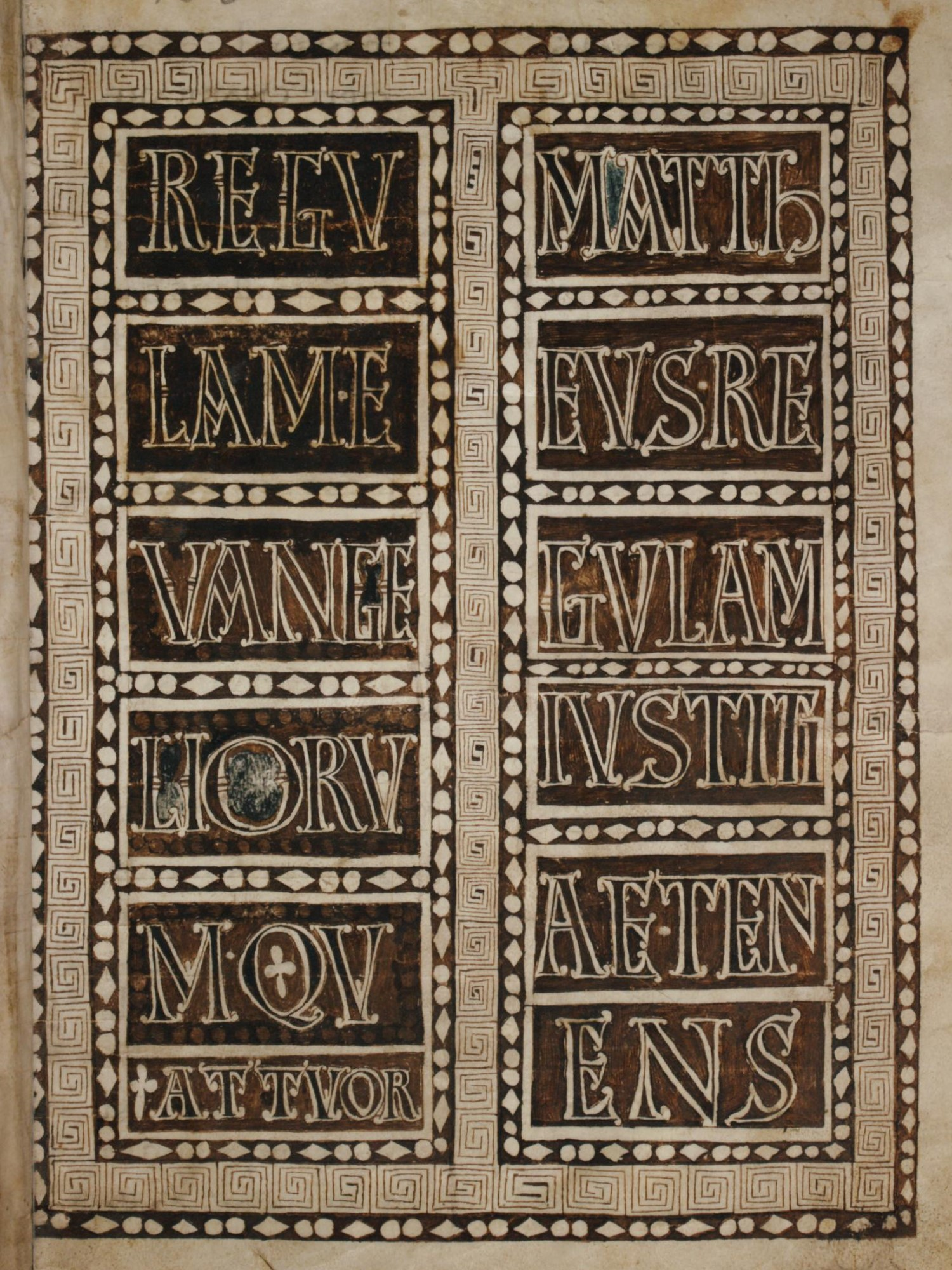
Title page of an early 9th-century copy of Fortunatianus' gospel commentary

Fortunatianus of Aquileia (c.300-c.370) was an African, Christian poet, and bishop of Aquileia in the mid-fourth century, during the reign of Constantius II.

The exact year of his birth is unknown, although it was around 300, and there is no recorded information concerning his early life.

He is best known for his commentary on the Gospels.

== Writings ==
The principal ancient source for Fortunatianus of Aquileia is a paragraph referencing him in De Viris Illustribus composed by Saint Jerome in 393.

Fortunatianus wrote a commentary on the Gospels which, according to its reference by Saint Jerome, is the oldest surviving Western commentary on the Gospels, though the document was lost for over a millennium.

The commentary was known from only a few excerpts: two identified by French monk and scholar André Wilmart (1876-1941) from a Troyes manuscript, one from Angers identified by German philologist and paleographer Bernhard Bischoff (1906-1991), and a reference in Saint Jerome's correspondence (thus predating Hilary on St. Matthew).

In 2012, Fortunatianus' lost commentary was identified by the editor Lukas Dorfbauer in a ninth-century manuscript from the library of Cologne Cathedral. A translation into English by H.A.G. Houghton of the rediscovered commentary was published in 2017.

== Beliefs ==
Fortunatianus was assumed to have favoured anti-Nicene doctrine, though a text from 984 to 986 clearly states that Trinity was one substance he inclined. Additionally, he alleged there was a large element of figurative language found in the Gospel narratives. He identified two of the four Evangelists in relation to Ezekiel and the Apocalypse; in particular, he suggested that Mark was symbolized as the eagle and John as the lion (Lampe, 1998).

Fortunatianus was a signatory at the western Council of Serdica which condemned Arius' teaching. He subsequently entertained Athanasius on his return journey from Treves to Alexandria, and was chosen by Pope Liberius to defend Athanasius at the Council of Milan. However he yielded to pressure from Emperor Constantius II. In the aftermath of the council, he urged Pope Liberius to conform.
