= Tiberianus of Baetica =

Biblical scholar (4th century AD)

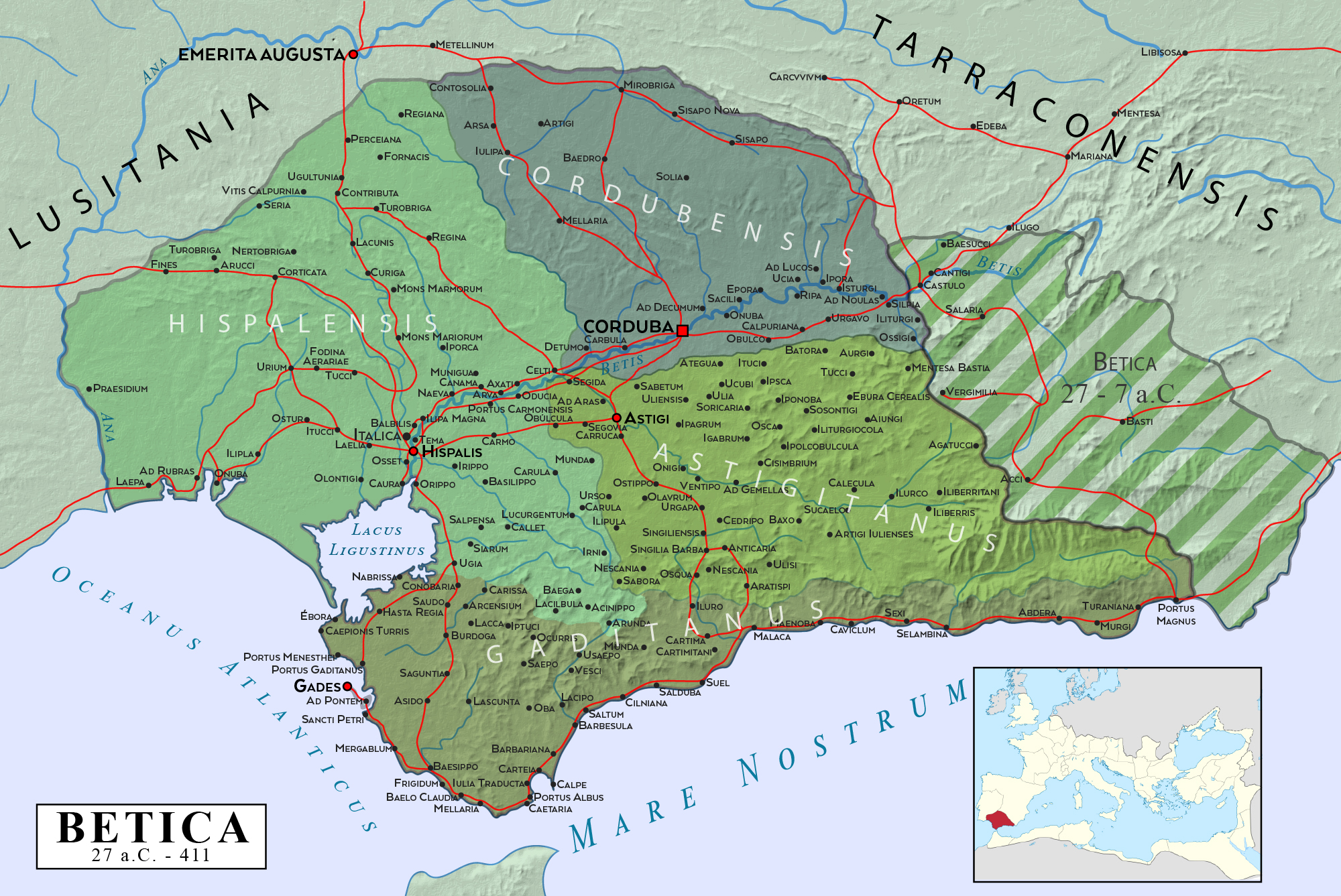
Map of Hispania Baetica

Tiberianus of Baetica (fl. late 4th century AD), or Tiberianus the Baetican, was a Christian writer of the late 4th century AD from Hispania Baetica. In Jerome's De viris illustribus, he writes that Tiberianus was accused of Priscillianism, but wrote an apology "in pompous and mongrel language." He was exiled to the Scilly Isles (Scillonia insula) along with Instantius.

Jerome adds that "after the death of his friends, overcome by the tediousness of exile, he changed his mind, as it is written in Holy Scripture “the dog returned to his vomit,” and married a nun, a virgin dedicated to Christ."
