= Candidus (theologian) =

2nd-century Christian theologian

Candidus (fl. c. AD 196) was a Christian theologian of the late 2nd century.

In Jerome's De viris illustribus, he writes that Candidus lived during the reigns of Commodus and Septimius Severus (i.e. late 2nd century), and that he wrote on the topic of the six days of creation. He is also mentioned by Eusebius for the same work. It is likely that the writing was directed against the theology of Marcion.
