= Musanus =

Early Christian writer

Musanus was an early Christian writer mentioned briefly by Eusebius in his Church History as the author of a book, extant in his time, against the Encratites. Jerome, probably based on Eusebius, also wrote about him in De Viris Illustribus (c. 31).
