= Rhodo =

2nd-century Christian writer

Rhodo was a Christian writer who flourished in the time of the Roman emperor Commodus (180-92); he was a native of the province of Asia Minor who came to Rome where he was a pupil of Tatian.

He wrote several books, two of which are mentioned by Eusebius of Caesarea: a treatise on "The Six Days of Creation", and a work against the Marcionites, in which he focussed upon the various opinions which divided them. Eusebius, upon whom modern historians depend exclusively for our knowledge of Rhodo, quotes some passages from the latter work, in one of which an account is given of the Marcionite Apelles.

Jerome's De Viris Illustribus amplifies Eusebius's account somewhat by making Rhodo the author of a work against the Cataphrygians: probably he had in mind an anonymous work quoted by Eusebius a little later.
