= Malchion =

Presbyter of Antioch

Malchion, a Church Father and presbyter of Antioch during the reigns of Emperors Claudius II and Aurelian, was a well-known rhetorician most notable for his key role in the 272 AD deposition of the heretical bishop of Antioch, Paul of Samosata. He was very familiar with and frequently quoted pagan authors. and was president of the faculty of rhetoric while presbyter of Antioch. He forced Paul to reveal his beliefs and wrote a letter calling him a heretic and criminal to the bishops of Rome and Alexandria. St. Jerome, a Great Western Doctor of the Catholic Church, dedicates chapter 71 of his biographical tome On Illustrious Men to Malchion.
