= Heraclitus (bishop) =

Heraclitus (Greek: Ἡράκλειτος, romanized: Hērakleitos; fl. c. AD 190–200) was a Christian Biblical scholar and bishop of the late 2nd century.

According to Eusebius, and Jerome in De viris illustribus, Heraclitus wrote commentaries on the Acts of the Apostles and/or the Epistles, (Note: Eusebius calls it τὰ ῾Ηρακλείτου εἰς τὸν ἀπόστολον (ta Hērakleitou eis ton apostolon), and Jerome calls it in apostolum Commentarios, which is believed to refer to the Epistles.) during the reigns of Commodus and Septimius Severus.
