= Sextus (theologian) =

2nd-century Christian theologian

Sextus (Greek: Σέξτος, romanized: Sextos; fl. c. AD 196) was a Christian theologian of the late 2nd century.

In Jerome's De viris illustribus, he writes that Sextus lived during the reign of Septimius Severus (i.e. late 2nd century), and that he wrote on the topic of the Resurrection of Jesus. He is also mentioned by Eusebius for the same work.
