= Jesús Alturo i Perucho =

Palaeographer, philologist and culture historian

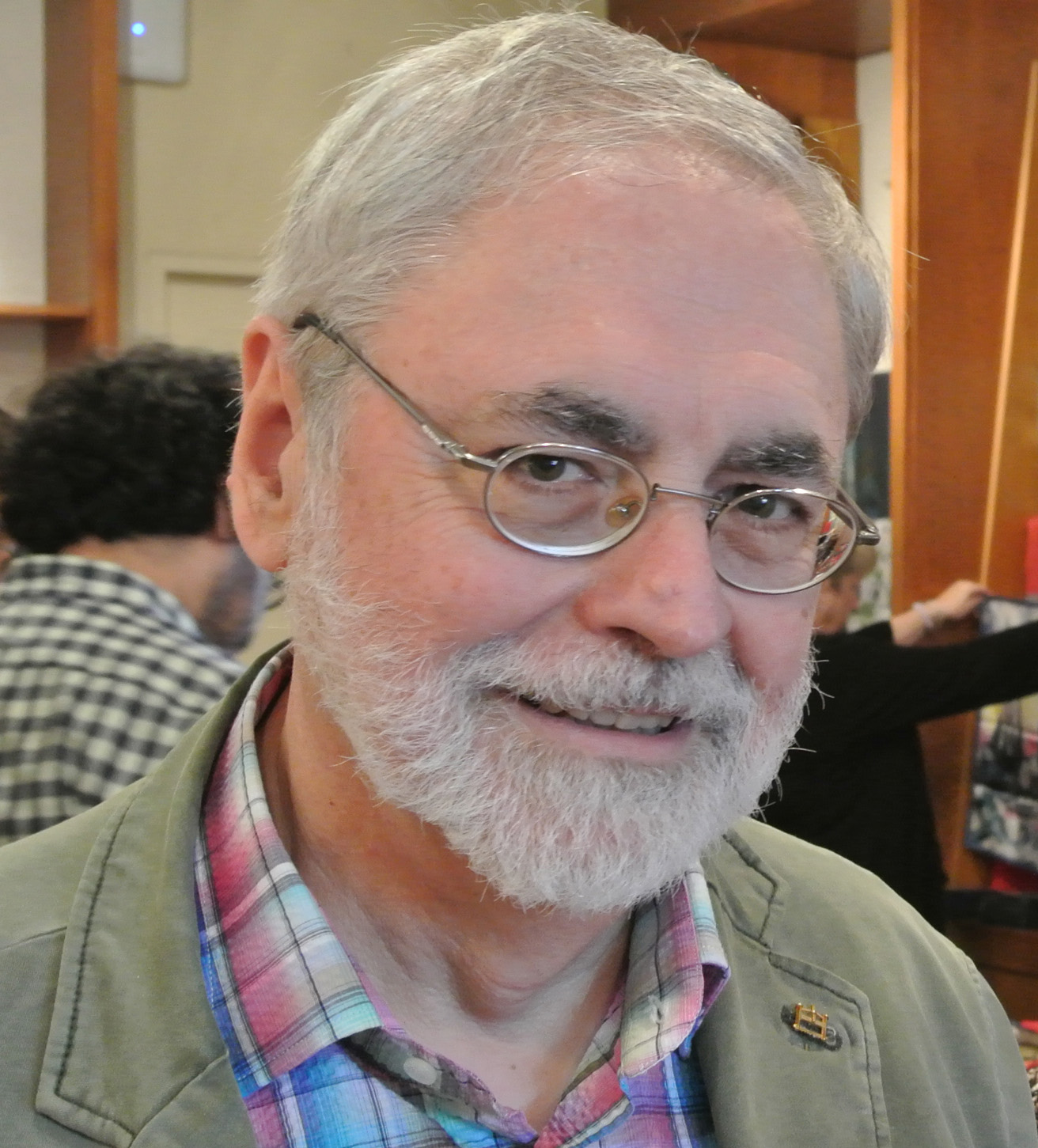
- Born: March 10, 1954; El Pont de Suert, Spain
- Education: Doctor in classics
- Occupations: Professor of palaeography, codicology and diplomatics

Jesús Alturo i Perucho (born 10 March 1954 in El Pont de Suert) is a Catalan palaeographer, philologist and cultural historian.

== Academic career ==
Alturo is professor at the Autonomous University of Barcelona, initially in Latin Philology (since 1976) and later in palaeography, codicology and diplomatics (since 1992), as chair and replacing his teacher, Anscari M. Mundó.

A doctor in classics, he is a specialist in the Middle Ages, in particular in the field of cultural history, not only in Catalonia, but also in Europe.

He became a member of the Comité International de Paléographie Latine in 1994. He is a member of the Société nationale des antiquaires de la France (2013), a corresponding member of the Reial Acadèmia de Bones Lletres de Barcelona (2007), an honorary member of the Societat Catalana de Numismàtica and a member of the Societat Catalana d'Estudis Litúrgics (Institut d'Estudis Catalans). He has been Directeur d'Études invité at l'École Pratique des Hautes Études de París. Under the project Monumenta Palaeographica Medii Aevi, he is director of the Series Hispanica. In 2017 he published Chartae Latinae Antiquiores Cataloniae, which bring together a total of 100 original charters from the 9th century, preserved in Catalan archives.

Alturo is author of an extensive bibliographic and academic production with more than three hundred papers, books or chapters of books, which includes the publication and analysis of various medieval charters collections, and of fragments of manuscripts, identifying and studying pieces as relevant as the earliest known evidence of the Liber de dono perseuerantiae by Augustine of Hippo, of the Pamphilus de amore, of the Jaufré, of the pilgrim Egeria, among others. He is also the author of critical editions of medieval literary texts, such as sermons attributed to the bishop and abbot Oliba or the grammarian Borrell Guibert, and of early medieval epigraphic texts and studies of early medieval Latin glossaries, among which those that denote the diffusion of the Liber glossarum in Catalonia. In 2019 he produced a new critical edition of the Planctus monialis transmitted by the ms. Vat. lat. 3251. He also identified and published a critical edition of an unknown testimony of another planctus monialis from Santa María de Obarra.

As a palaeographer, Alturo has also identified the authors of numerous copies of entire manuscripts, simple fragments of codices and even anonymous charters, with names such as Altimir, At, Eiximèn, Isarn, Llop and Recared. He has done so by unequivocally proving that the presbyters of the diplomas and the amanuensis who copied the codices were very often the same person and applying to his study his own approach based on the study of graphic particularities, that is, the smallest details that personalize the script.

In October 2021 Alturo, with Tània Alaix, identified the author of the Complaints of Guitard Isarn, Lord of Caboet, in the person of the subdeacon Ramon de Cabó, who has become, for now, the first author of Catalan literature. Interested also by the first written witnesses of Catalan language, he has dated the Homilies d'Organyà, and of the Catalan translation of the Visigothic Code, both preserved in a fragment of a codex from Santa Maria de Montserrat Abbey and of the one served in the Archives of the Bishopric of Urgell.

== Awards ==
In 1982 Alturo was awarded with the Premi Ciutat de Barcelona for his research L'arxiu antic de Santa Anna de Barcelona del 942 al 1200. (Aproximació històrico-lingüística). In 2004 his work was awarded with the Premi Crítica Serra d'Or for the book Història del llibre manuscrit a Catalunya. This book is considered the standard introduction to the subject in Catalonia. On 13 December 2021, he received the Creu de Sant Jordi for “his major contributions to the history of medieval literature and art of the Romanesque period in Catalonia”.

== Books ==
- L’Arxiu Antic de Santa Anna de Barcelona (Fons de Santa Anna i de Santa Eulàlia del Camp) del 942 al 1200: aproximació històrico-lingüística, 3 vol., (1985)
- Diplomatari de Polinyà del Vallès: aproximació a la història d'un poble del segle X al XII (1985)
- Mundó, Anscari M.Obres completes. 1, De la romanitat a la sobirania. (1997)
- Diplomatari d’Alguaire i del seu monestir santjoanista, de 1076 a 1245 (1999)
- Studia in codicum fragmenta (1999)
- El llibre manuscrit a Catalunya: orígens i esplendor (2000; 2d ed. 2001)
- Liber iudicum popularis ordenat pel jutge Bonsom de Barcelona, ed. by J. Alturo, J. Bellés, J.M. Font i Rius, Y. García, A.M. Mundó (2003)
- Història del llibre manuscrit a Catalunya (2004)
- El Llibre i la lectura: de l’antigüitat a l'època moderna (2008)
- El calze i la lira entre reixes: culte i textos clandestins dins la Presó Model de Barcelona (1937) (2008)
- Diplomatari d’Alguaire i del seu monestir duple de Sant Joan de Jerusalem (1245 a 1300) (2010)
- Memòries de la Guerra Civil i notes parroquials de postguerra de Mn. Joan Agut i Ribera, rector de Santa Maria de Montmaneu (2011)
- La Producció i circulació de llibres clandestins des de l'antiguitat fins als nostres dies: actes de les segones Jornades internacionals sobre història del llibre i de la lectura: 20 i 21 d'octubre de 2010, ed. by J. Alturo, M. Torras and A. Castro (2012)
- La Escritura visigótica en la Península Ibérica: nuevas aportaciones, Jornadas Internacionales ed. by J. Alturo, M. Torras and A. Castro (2012)
- Alturo, J., and T. Alaix. L’església de Sant Salvador de Polinyà i les seves pintures (2016)
- Alturo, J., and T. Alaix. Chartae Latinae Antiquiores Cataloniae, 3 vol., (2017–18) (in English)
- Alturo, J., and T. Alaix. Mil cent anys de la vila i de la parròquia de Santa Maria de Llinars (2019)
- Alturo, J., and T. Alaix. L’antependi de Sant Martí de Lleida a Baltimore i altres obres de l’art medieval català (2020)
- Alturo, J., and T. Alaix. El canonge Adanagell de Vic (ca. 860-925), llavor de noves semences: la cultura a la diòcesi d’Osona en els primers temps carolingis (2021)
