= Acilius Severus (writer) =

4th century Roman Christian writer

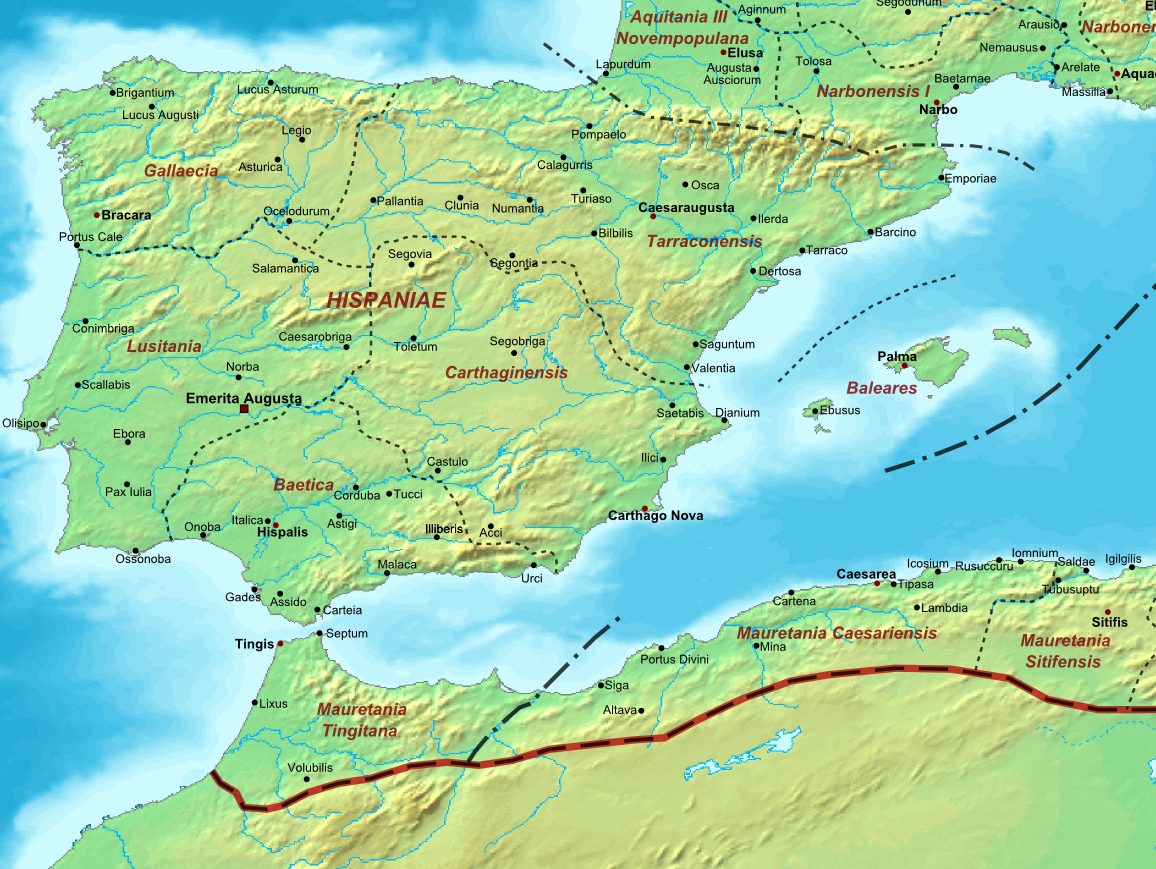
Map of Hispania in Acilius Severus' time

Acilius Severus (died between AD 364 and 375; in some editions spelled Aquilus, Aquilius) was a Roman Christian writer of the late 4th century AD, from Hispania. He was from a senatorial family based on known correspondence with the Roman writer Lactantius (c. 250 – c. 325) through written epistles to his ancestors. A fragmentary inscription dictated that his ancestry was rooted from the gens Acilia, a noble family since the first century CE. Severus’ father, who was also called Acilius Severus, was a Roman consul in 323 and prefect of Rome from 325 to 327.

In Jerome's De viris illustribus, he writes that Acilius Severus wrote an autobiography in "a volume of mingled poetry and prose," entitled Καταστροφὴν (katastrophḗn, "vicissitudes, calamity") or Πεῖραν (peiran, "proofs, trial"). An inscription also commemorated his restoration of the theater of Merida around 333 and 337. During this period, he was described to have come from Hispaniarum. His patronage of the theater suggests that his family came from Spain. In Jerome’s work, the account of Acilius life story ended in his conversion to Christianity.
