= De viris illustribus =

Genre of literature about illustrious figures

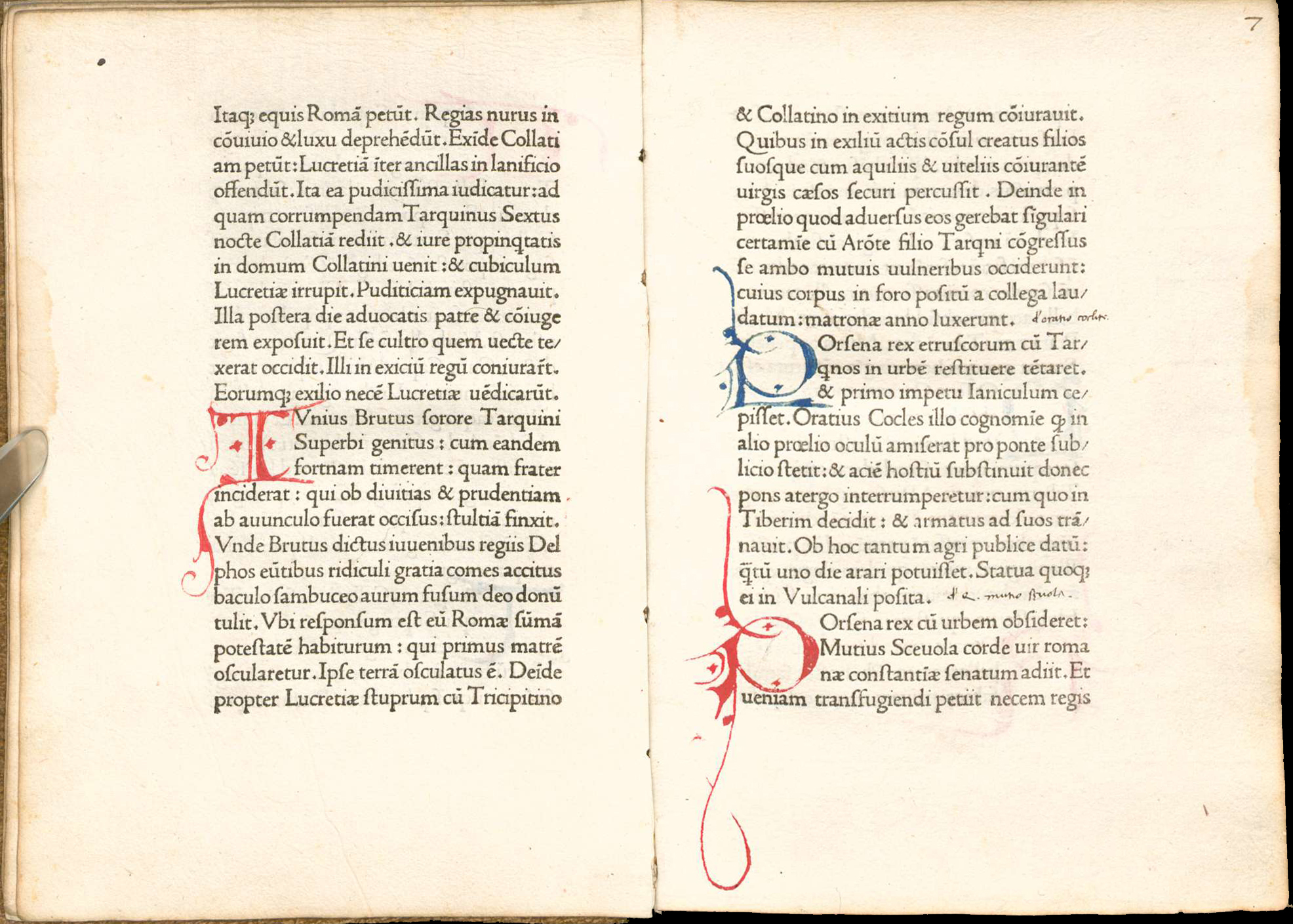
A copy of De viris illustribus printed by Nicolas Jenson about 1474

De Viris Illustribus, meaning "concerning illustrious men", represents a genre of literature which evolved during the Italian Renaissance in imitation of the exemplary literature of Ancient Rome. It inspired the widespread commissioning of groups of matching portraits of famous men from history (homini famosi) to serve as moral role models.

With its inception in the circle of Cicero, various ancient works bear the titles De Viris Illustribus or De hominibus illustribus, including:

- Cornelius Nepos' De Viris Illustribus, from which Aulus Gellius draws an anecdote of Cato the Elder; Cornelius Nepos also produced a Liber De Excellentibus Ducibus Gentium (Lives of Eminent Commanders).
- Suetonius' fragmentary Lives include grammarians, rhetoricians, historians, and poets.
- An anonymous De Viris Illustribus probably dating to the first half of the 4th century is a compilation of 86 brief biographies of individuals important to Roman history, from the legendary Alban king Proca to Cleopatra. This work was initially attributed to Aurelius Victor, under the name De Viris Illustribus Romae.
- Jerome's collection of Christian biographies, De Viris Illustribus, contains 135 brief notices.
- Gennadius of Massilia's De Viris Illustribus, who continued Jerome's work.
- Isidore of Seville's De Viris Illustribus.

During the Middle Ages the inspirational series took two paths: the specifically Christian models were enshrined in hagiography, in which miracles attracted the attention and the qualities exemplified by martyrs were those of fortitude, faith and obedience. On the secular side, the worldly models were codified in the Nine Worthies, chivalric exemplars of valiant courtoisie, the instructive models of aristocratic courtly behavior. The literary biographies were reflected in illustrated versions in illuminated manuscripts, tapestry and other media.

With the revival of classical learning in the Italian Renaissance, a broader, carefully selected group of men of renown from the distant and recent past, outstanding for their statecraft or their learning emerged "almost simultaneously" in the Italian cities of Milan, Naples, Siena, Padua, Foligno, Florence, Venice, Perugia and Urbino. In literature the theme was revived by Giovanni Colonna around 1330. His friend, Petrarch, penned a De viris illustribus, as a collection of 36 short biographies. Boccaccio, inspired by him, wrote De Casibus Virorum Illustrium ("On the Fates of Famous Men"), a collection of 56 biographies. Boccaccio also wrote a feminine complement to it, De mulieribus claris ("On Famous Women"), containing 106 biographies. Leonardo Bruni published translations of Plutarch's Lives.

The humanist Poggio Bracciolini urged in his essay De Nobilitate Liber ("Book on Nobility"), that the Romans should be emulated "for they believed that the images of men who had excelled in the pursuit of glory and wisdom, if placed before the eyes, would help enoble and stir up the soul." A series of instructive uomini illustri portraits was painted for Azzo Visconti in Milan, and was mentioned by Giorgio Vasari, but is now lost, together with a series in Naples, but important early series of portraits of famous men survive in the Palazzo Pubblico, Siena and in the Sala Virorum Illustrium ("Hall of Illustrious Men") (or Sala dei Giganti) in the Reggia Carrarese, Padua.

The Giovio Series of portraits of literary figures, rulers, statesmen and other dignitaries, many of which were made from life, was assembled by Renaissance historian and biographer Paolo Giovio (1483–1552) but was subsequently lost. It is represented today by the set of copies made for Cosimo I de' Medici in the Uffizi Gallery in Florence.

The genre continues today, not so much in universal biographical dictionaries, which verge on factual prosopography, but in collections of inspirational biographies such as Profiles in Courage.
