= Victor of Antioch =

Victor of Antioch (Greek: Βίκτωρ της Αντιόχειας) (fl. in 407–444) was an early Christian presbyter and biblical commentator. A contemporary of John Chrysostom, he wrote a Greek catena on the Gospel of Mark, the Catena in Marcum, in which he defended the view entertained by the Church at the time, with references to fasting and the belief that Christians have entire liberty of action.

Although often considered the earliest known commentary on Mark, the 7th-century commentary of Pseudo-Jerome is a more original work. Nevertheless, Victor's Catena in Marcum contains some original material, especially when comparing the different Gospels.

Several catenae on the Gospel of Luke cite certain opinions to Victor, indicating that he wrote a commentary on Luke, but this is lost apart from these quotations.

== Editions ==
- Lamb, William R. S., ed. (2012). The Catena in Marcum: A Byzantine Anthology of Early Commentary on Mark. Leiden: Brill.
