= Juvencus =

4th-century Roman poet

Gaius Vettius Aquilinus Juvencus (fl. c. 330) was a Roman Christian poet from Hispania who wrote in Latin. His work was well known in the Middle Ages, being cited, for example, in the British Isles.

== Life ==
The only source on Juvencus's life is Jerome. He was a Spaniard of very good birth, became a priest, and wrote in the time of Constantine I. From one passage in his work (II, 806, sq.) and from Jerome's Chronicle it must be inferred that he wrote about the year 330.

== Works ==
His poem, in dactylic hexameters, is entitled Evangeliorum libri IV (The Four Books of the Gospels). It is a history of Christ according to the Gospels, particularly that of Matthew. He goes to the other Evangelists for what he does not find in Matthew — as the story of the Infancy of Christ, which he takes from Luke. He follows his model very closely, "almost literally", as St. Jerome says.

The whole problem for him is to render the Gospel text into easy language conformable to the tradition of the Latin poets, and borrowed especially from Virgil. His task permits of little originality beyond that exhibited in new words composed, or derived, according to familiar types (auricolor, flammiuomus, flammicomans, sinuamen), elegant synonyms to express the Christian realities (tonans for "God", genitor for the Father, spiramen for the Holy Ghost, uersutia for the Devil), or, lastly, archaic expressions. The language is correct and the verses well constructed, but there is little colour or movement. A few obscurities of Prosody betray the period in which the work was written. The whole effect is carefully wrought out.

In the prologue, Juvencus announces that he wishes to meet the lying tales of the pagan poets, Homer and Virgil, with the glories of the true Faith. He hopes that his poem will survive the destruction of the world by fire, and will deliver him, the poet, from hell. He invokes the Holy Spirit as the pagans invoked the Muses or Apollo.

The work is divided into four books, which make arbitrary divisions of the life of Christ. The number four seems to be symbolical, corresponding to the number of the Evangelists. Other traces of symbolism have been found in Juvencus, the most notable being the significance attached to the gifts of the Magi — the incense offered to the God, the gold to the King, the myrrh to the Man.

Lastly, eight preliminary verses, Juvencus's authorship of which is disputed, characterize the Evangelists and assign emblems to them; but they assign the eagle to Mark and the lion to John.

The Bible text which Juvencus paraphrased was of course an ancient one. He appears, too, to have had recourse at times to the Greek text. The source of his poetical phraseology and his technic is, first, Virgil, then Lucretius, Propertius, Horace, Ovid, Silius Italicus, and Statius. The cold correctness of the work recommended it to the taste of the Middle Ages, when it was frequently quoted, imitated, and copied.

Jerome mentions that Juvencus composed another, shorter, Christian poem on "the order of the mysteries" (Sacramentorum ordinem). This work is lost.

Modern writers have incorrectly attributed to him the Heptateuchus, a work of Cyprianus Gallus, and the De Laudibus Domini, a work of Juvencus's time, but to be credited to some pupil of the rhetoricians of Augustodunum (Autun).

== Editions and translations ==
- Reginald Oliver published an edition of Historia Evangelica in Ipswich in 1534.
- C. Marold (Leipzig, 1886) in the "Bibliotheca Teubneriana"
- J. Hümer (Vienna, 1891) in the "Corpus script. ecclesiast. latinorum"
- McGill, Scott (2016). Juvencus' Four books of the Gospels: Evangeliorum libri quattuor. Routledge later Latin poetry. London: Routledge. doi:10.4324/9781315646978. ISBN 978-0-415-63583-7.
