= Arabianus =

Christian writer (lived c.196)

Arabianus (Ancient Greek: Ἀραβιανὸς, romanized: Arabianos) was an eminent Christian writer who lived around 196. He composed some books on Christian doctrine, which are lost. Nothing more is known of him, and the writers who mention him, like Eusebius, do not even tell us the title of the work Arabianus wrote. Jerome says that he wrote "certain small works relating to Christian doctrine."
