= Theotimos (bishop of Tomi) =

Theotimus was a writer and friend of St. John Chrysostom. He was bishop of the Scythian diocese of Tomi, near the Black Sea, from 392 to 403 (or 407, when he died), who tried to convert the Huns. He published brief and epigrammatical treatises, in the form of dialogues, and in olden style.

== Life ==
Theotimus was a native of Dacia Pontica, and was part Roman.

== Church government ==
Chapter 26 of Book VII of the Ecclesiastical History, written by Sozomen, states: "The church of Tomi, and indeed all the churches of Scythia, were at this period under the government of Theotimus, a Scythian. He had been brought up in the practice of philosophy; and his virtues had so won the admiration of the barbarian Huns, who dwelt on the banks of the Ister, that they called him the god of the Romans, for they had experience of divine deeds wrought by him. It is said that one day, when traveling toward the country of the barbarians, he perceived some of them advancing towards Total. His attendants burst forth into lamentations, and gave themselves up at once for lost; but he merely descended from horseback, and prayed. The consequence was, that the barbarians passed by without seeing him, his attendants, or the horses from which they had dismounted.

As these tribes frequently devastated Scythia by their predatory incursions, he tried to subdue the ferocity of their disposition by presenting them with food and gifts. One of the barbarians hence concluded that he was a man of wealth, and, determining to take him prisoner, leaned upon his shield, as was his custom when parleying with his enemies; the man raised up his right hand in order to throw a rope, which he firmly grasped, over the bishop, for he intended to drag him away to his own country; but in the attempt, his hand remained extended in the air, and the barbarian was not released from his terrible bonds until his companions had implored Theotimus to intercede with God in his behalf.

It is said that Theotimus always retained the long hair which he wore when he first devoted himself to the practice of philosophy. He was very temperate, had no stated hours for his repasts, but ate and drank when compelled to do so by the calls of hunger and of thirst. I consider it to be the part of a philosopher to yield to the demands of these appetites from necessity, and not from the love of sensual gratification."

== Opposition of Epiphanius ==
Chapter 14 of Book VIII of the Ecclesiastical History also says: "Theotimus, bishop of Scythia, strongly opposed the proceedings of Epiphanius, who had persuaded some of the bishops residing in Constantinople to approve of the decrees which he had issued against the discourses of Origen, and told him that it was not right to cast insult on the memory of one who had long been numbered with the dead; nor was it without blasphemy to assail the conclusion to which the ancients had arrived on the subject, and to set aside their decisions. While discoursing in this strain, he drew forth a book of Origen's which he had brought with him; and, after reading aloud a passage conducive to the education of the Church, he remarked that those who condemned such sentiments acted absurdly, for they were in danger of insulting the subjects themselves about which these words treated."

== Veneration ==
His feast day in the Catholic Church is April 20. In the Eastern Orthodox Church, Theotimos and Theodoulos the Executioners are venerated on September 4.

== Sources ==
- (passim)
