= Gennadius of Massilia =

Christian priest and historian (died c. 496)

Gennadius of Massilia (died c. 496), also known as Gennadius Scholasticus or Gennadius Massiliensis, was a 5th-century Christian priest, monk, and historian.

His best-known work is De Viris Illustribus ("Of Famous Men"), a biography of over 90 contemporary significant Christians, which continued a work of the same name by Jerome.

== Life ==
Gennadius was a monk and later priest of Massilia (now Marseille), a contemporary of Pope Gelasius I (pope from 492 to 496). Considered by Christopher Blunda to be "one of the most theologically learned figures of his day", he was familiar with the lives of authors spanning the previous eight decades.

Little is known of his life, except for a brief statement in the last biography he wrote: "I, Gennadius, presbyter of Massilia, wrote eight books against all heresies, five books against Nestorius, ten books against Eutyches, three books against Pelagius, a treatise on the thousand years of the Apocalypse of John, this work, and a letter about my faith sent to blessed Gelasius, bishop of the city of Rome".

== Writings ==
Gennadius knew Greek well and was familiar with Eastern and Western, orthodox and heretical Christian literature. He was a diligent compiler and a competent critic.

=== De Viris Illustribus ===
De Viris Illustribus, in its most commonly accepted form, was probably published c. 495 and contains, in some ten folio pages, short biographies of ecclesiastics between the years 392 and 495. It is an important historical source on the over ninety authors treated therein, and in many cases the only surviving record.

It is a continuation of St. Jerome's De Viris Illustribus. In that work Jerome had for the first time drawn up a series of 135 short biographies of famous Christians, with lists of their chief writings. It was the first patrology and dictionary of Christian biography, and became very popular. Many people, including a disciple of Jerome named Paterius, wrote similar continuations; Sophronius produced a Greek translation.

It was Gennadius's continuation that became most popular and was accepted everywhere as a second part of Jerome's work, and was always written (eventually printed) together with his. Gennadius's part contains about one hundred lives, modelled closely after those of Jerome. Various edits and reprints do not number them consistently; by Bernoulli, i to xcvii, with some marked as xciib, etc., originally cxxxvi-ccxxxii).

The series is arranged more or less in chronological order, but there are frequent exceptions.

In xc, 92, he says (in one version) that Theodore of Coelesyria (Theodulus) "died three years ago, in the reign of Zeno". From this Czapla deduces that Gennadius wrote between 491 and 494.

The present form of the text indicates a repeated revision of the entire work. Other people have modified it and added to it without noting the fact—as is usual among medieval writers. Some scholars including Richardson and Czapla consider that chapters xxx (Bishop John II of Jerusalem), lxxxvii (Victorinus), xciii (Caerealis of Africa.), and all the end portion (xcv-ci), are not authentic. There is doubt about parts of the others.

=== Other writings ===
Gennadius states that he composed a number of other works, most of which are not extant:

- Adversus omnes hæreses libri viii., "Against all heresies" in 8 volumes
- Five books against Nestorius
- Ten books against Eutyches
- Three books against Pelagius
- Tractatus de millennio et de apocalypsi beati Johannis, "Treatise on the thousand years and on the Apocalypse of St. John"
- Epistola de fide, a "letter of faith" which he sent to Pope Gelasius.
- Works of Evagrius Ponticus and of Timothy Ælurus, translated and restored to their authentic form. These translations are also lost.

=== De Ecclesiasticis Dogmatibus ===
There is a treatise called De Ecclesiasticis Dogmatibus ("Of Church Doctrine") which was originally attributed to Augustine of Hippo but is now universally attributed to Gennadius. The work was long included among those of St. Augustine.

Some scholars (Carl Paul Caspari, Otto Bardenhewer, Bruno Czapla) think that it is probably a fragment of Gennadius's eight books "against all heresies", apparently the last part, in which, having confuted the heretics, he builds up a positive system.

=== Publication ===
The De Viris Illustribus was edited and published by J. Andreas (Rome, 1468), by J. A. Fabricius in Bibliotheca ecclesiastica (Hamburg, 1718), and by E. C. Richardson in Texte und Untersuchungen, xiv. (Leipsig, 1896). It also appears with many editions of the works of Jerome.

An English translation by Richardson was produced in the Nicene and Post-Nicene Fathers, 2nd ser, iii. 385–402.

A critical edition of the Liber de Ecclesiasticis Dogmatibus under the title Liber Ecclesiasticorum Dogmatum was published by C. H. Turner in the Journal of Theological Studies vii. (1905), pp. 78–99 at pp. 89–99. Turner's introduction reviews a number of previous editions and also provides a survey of manuscript copies that were known to him, including several that he used for the edition.

== Theological Views ==
It has been said that Gennadius was of the so-called Semi-Pelagian persuasion, but this terminology was coined in the 16th century and is contested. In "De Viris Illustribus" Semi-Pelagians among the Catholics are warmly praised (Fastidiosus, lvi, p. 80; Cassian, lxi, 81; Faustus of Riez, lxxxv, 89), while full Pelagians (Pelagius himself, xlii, 77; Julian of Eclanum, xlv, 77) are called heretics. Augustinians, however, are also given praise (Augustine of Hippo, xxxviii, 75; Prosper of Aquitaine, lxxxiv, 89), though perhaps somewhat muted. While it is generally accepted that his theological sympathies were with the Semi-Pelagians, there is scholarly disagreement over Gennadius' position with regard to Augustine. Thomas O'Loughlin says Gennadius counted Augustine "among the illustrious teachers" and therefore serves as a witness to his positive reception in the generations immediately after his death, whereas Christopher Blunda interprets him as trying to "counteract [Augustine's] posthumous ascendance as a doctrinal authority" by dedicating a relatively terse entry to him, praising his piety and learning but ignoring most of his writings, and implying that some of his teachings were erroneous or could lead to confusion.

The Catholic Encyclopedia detects similar Semi-Pelagian tendencies in the treatise "De eccles. dogmatibus", which is said to be "full of Semipelagianism, either open or implied (original sin carefully evaded, great insistence on free will and denial of predestination, grace as an adjutorium in the mildest form, etc.)." Gennadius considers (like later writers, e.g. Thomas Aquinas) that all men, even those alive at the Second Coming, will have to die. But this conviction, though derived from a widespread patristic tradition, is, he admits, rejected by equally catholic and learned Fathers.

Of the theories concerning the soul of man subsequently known as the creationist and the traducianist views, he espouses the creationist. He will not allow the existence of the spirit as a third element in man besides the body and the soul, but regards it as only another name for the soul.

In De Ecclesiasticis Dogmatibus, his views include the following points:

- Heretical baptism is not to be repeated, unless it has been administered by heretics who would have declined to employ the invocation of the Holy Trinity.
- All not under the burden of mortal sin should receive the Eucharist weekly. Such as are should have recourse to public penitence.
- Private penance may suffice; but even here outward manifestation, such as change of dress, is desirable.
- Daily reception of holy communion he will neither praise nor blame.
- Evil was invented by Satan.
- Though celibacy is rated above matrimony, to condemn marriage is Manichean.
- A twice-married Christian should not be ordained.
- Churches should be called after martyrs, and the relics of martyrs honoured.
- None but the baptized attain eternal life; not even catechumens, unless they suffer martyrdom.
- Penitence thoroughly avails to Christians even at their latest breath.
- Only God knows the secret thoughts of men; Satan can learn them only through observing human actions.
- Marvels might be wrought in the Lord's name even by bad men. Men can become holy without such marks.
- The freedom of man's will is strongly asserted, but the commencement of all goodness is assigned to divine grace.

The language of Gennadius is here not quite Augustinian; but neither is it Pelagian.
