= 30s BC =

Decade

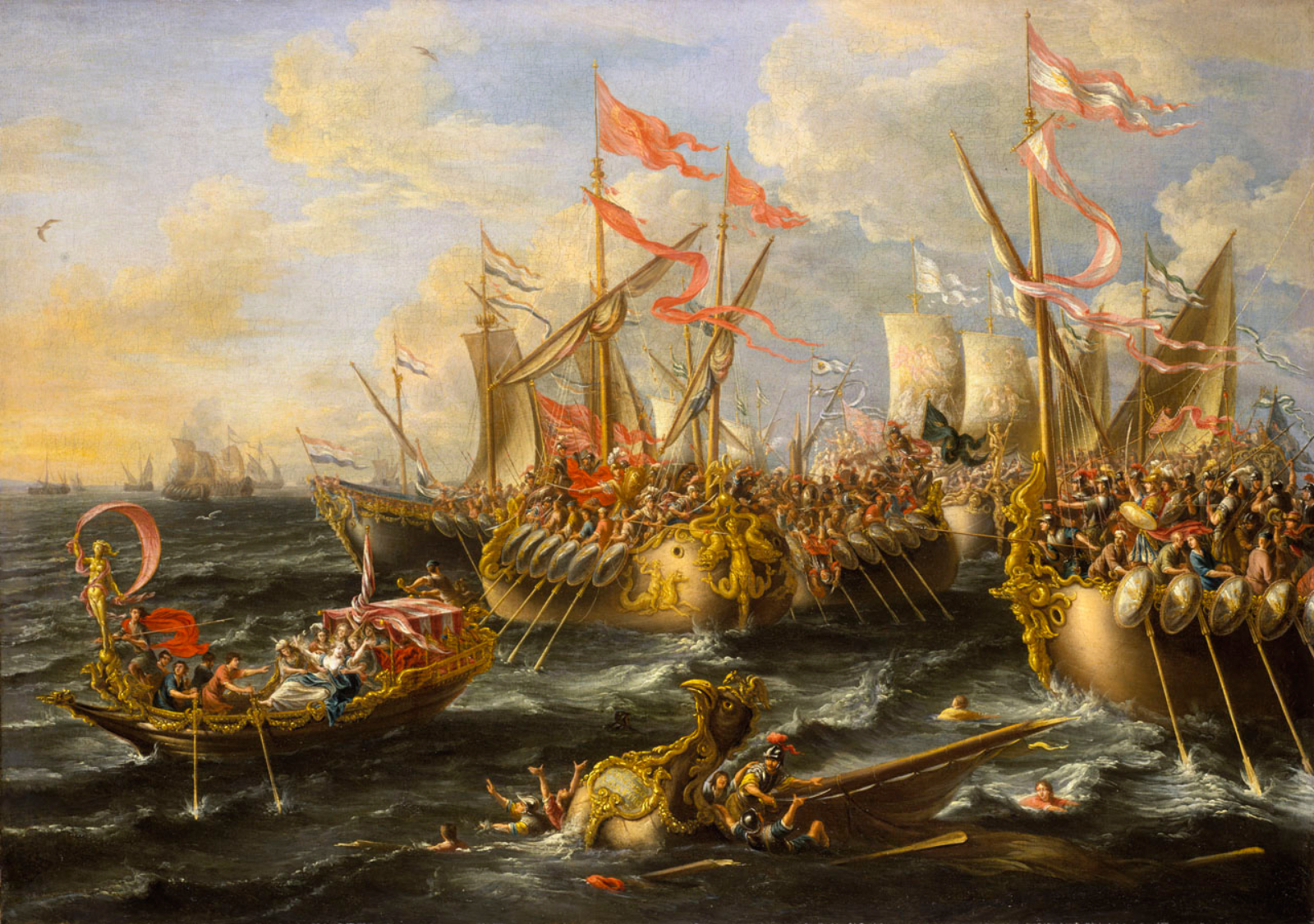
The War of Actium lasted from 32 BC to 30 BC, ending the Roman Republic.

The 30s BC were the period 39 BC – 30 BC.

== Events ==
=== 39 BC ===
==== By place ====
====== Roman Republic ======
- Marcus Antonius dispatches Publius Ventidius Bassus with 11 legions to the East and drives Quintus Labienus out of Asia Minor. Labienus retreats into Syria, where he receives Parthian reinforcements. Ventidius finally defeats him in the battle at the Taurus Mountains.
- Publius Ventidius defeats Pharnastanes with his cataphracts at the Amanus Gates, and goes on to reclaim Syria, Phoenicia and Judea. Labienus flees to Cilicia, where he is captured and executed.
- Sextus Pompey, styles himself "son of Neptune", controls Sicily, Sardinia, Corsica and the Peloponnesus, and is recognized by the Triumvirate in the Pact of Misenum. The pact helps to assure Rome's grain supply, and the blockade on Roman Italy is lifted.

====== Western Han Empire ======
- 39 BC Yellow River flood

=== 38 BC ===
==== By place ====
====== Roman Republic ======
- January 1 – Beginning of the Hispanic era.
- January 17 – Octavian marries Livia while she is still pregnant from a recently broken marriage. Octavian gained permission from the College of Pontiffs to wed her while she is still pregnant from another husband. Three months after the wedding she gives birth to a second son, Nero Claudius Drusus, while he and his elder brother, the four-year-old Tiberius, are living in Octavian's household.
- Octavian appoints Marcus Vipsanius Agrippa governor of Transalpine Gaul, where he puts down an uprising of the Aquitanians. He also fights successfully against the Germanic tribes, and becomes the next Roman general to cross the Rhine after Julius Caesar.

=== 37 BC ===
==== By place ====
====== Roman Republic ======
- Consuls: Marcus Vipsanius Agrippa and Titus Statilius Taurus.
- Agrippa creates the harbour "Portus Julius" in the today-submersed town of Puteoli (the modern Pozzuoli, close to Naples). The port is used to train the warships for naval battles, and a new fleet is built, with 20,000 oarsmen gathered by freeing slaves. He also incorporates, on quinqueremes, a technical innovation, called the harpax ("snatcher"): a combination ballista and grappling hook, based on the corvus.
- Caesar Augustus (Octavian) engineers the "Second Pact of Tarentum" which renews the Triumvirate for an additional five years. Mark Antony exchanges 120 ships, for service against Sextus Pompeius. Octavian Caesar donates 1,000 troops from the Praetorian Guard and 20,000 legionaries for the Parthian campaign in Syria.
- Antony reorganizes Asia Minor under strongmen loyal to him. He raises troops from his allies: Amyntas and Archelaus, kings of Galatia and Cappadocia. The old kingdom of Pontus is restored, from Armenia to the River Halys under Polemon I.
- Romans conquer Jerusalem from the Parthians. Herod the Great becomes king of Judea and Ananelus is installed as High Priest; both positions are seized from Antigonus II Mattathias after a five-month siege. Thousands of Jews are slaughtered by Roman troops supporting Herod.

====== Asia ======
- The kingdom of Goguryeo in Korea is founded by the king Dongmyeong. (traditional date)

=== 36 BC ===
==== By place ====
====== Roman Republic ======
- Consuls: Lucius Gellius Poplicola and Marcus Cocceius Nerva.
- Publius Canidius Crassus invades Armenia and Iberia (Georgia); he forces Parnavaz II into an alliance against Zober, king of Albania.
- June – Mark Antony launches a major offensive against the Parthians, in which he marches with 10 legions and 10,000 cavalry to Carana in Anatolia.
- July – Octavian's fleet (102 warships) embarks from Puteoli and tries to invade Sicily, but it is caught in a storm at Vibo and forced to return.
- August – Marcus Vipsanius Agrippa, an admiral of Octavian Caesar, secures the Lipari Islands and harasses the coast from Mylae to Tyndaris. Octavian transports his legions, via Leucopetra, to Tauromenium (modern Taormina).
- Antony crosses the frontier into Media Atropatene and commences the siege of Phraaspa. He establishes a line of circumvallation and builds siege engines.
- September 3 – Battle of Naulochus: Agrippa defeats Sextus Pompeius, a son of Pompeius, in a naval engagement off Naulochus. Sextus escapes with 17 ships to Messana and then to Asia Minor.
- Marcus Lepidus lands 12 legions from Africa and lays siege to Lilybaeum. He loses his army to Octavian when his men mutiny. Lepidus is kept in luxurious captivity in Rome until his death.
- Agrippa receives the unprecedented honor of a Naval Crown (corona navalis), wrought of gold and decorated with the prows of ships.
- October – Antony abandons the siege of Phraaspa (near Maragheh, Iran). He retreats, loses many men to disease and starvation in the subsequent retreat to Egypt, and marries Cleopatra VII while still married to Octavia.
- Judea: Aristobulus III, the last of the Hasmoneans, becomes High Priest in Jerusalem, replacing Ananelus, who has only held the position for one year.

====== Asia ======
- October–December – The Han dynasty Chinese army under General Chen Tang and General Gan Yanshou defeat the Xiongnu leader Zhizhi Chanyu in the Battle of Zhizhi. This leads to half a century of peace between the Han dynasty and the Xiongnu until Wang Mang enrages them in the year AD 10, resuming hostilities between both sides.

=== 35 BC ===
==== By place ====
====== Parthian Empire ======
- Phraates IV ascended the Parthian throne after eliminating his father Orodes II and several royal rivals. The Mahestan (the noble council of the Parthian Empire) initially opposed his rise due to concerns about his violent methods. However, Phraates IV consolidated power by executing or exiling many council members, significantly weakening the influence of the Mahestan.

====== Roman Republic ======
- Illyria becomes a Roman province. Gaius Julius Caesar Octavian conducts a rendezvous with the Roman fleet under Agrippa, which is engaged in clearing the Dalmatian coast of piracy.
- Pannonia is attacked by Octavian Caesar, who conquers and sacks the stronghold Siscia (Sisak) of the Segestani, which is taken after a 30-day siege. The country is not definitely subdued, however, until 9 BC.
- Sextus Pompeius defeats the governor of Asia, Gaius Furnius, with three legions and seizes Nicaea and Nicomedia (modern Izmit).
- Marcus Titius arrives in Syria with a large army and marches to Asia Minor. Sextus is caught in Miletus and executed without trial.

====== India ======
- Azes I, Indo-Scythian ruler, completes the domination of the Scythians in northern India.

=== 34 BC ===
==== By place ====
====== Roman Republic ======
- Gaius Julius Caesar Octavian pacifies Dalmatia and Pannonia forming the province of Illyricum, while Antony regains Armenia from Parthia. Octavian reduces the outposts defending the Liburnian town of Promona, sets up siege works and forces its surrender.
- Mark Antony becomes Roman Consul for the second time. His partner is Lucius Scribonius Libo. The latter is replaced with Aemilius Lepidus Paullus during the year.
- Antony advances into Armenia with an expeditionary force (16 legions) and marches to the capital Artaxata. He arrests king Artavasdes II and takes him to Alexandria.
- Autumn – The Donations of Alexandria: Antony distributes the eastern kingdoms as a gift to the children of Cleopatra VII of Egypt; he declares Caesarion, Caesar's illegitimate son, as co-ruler of Egypt and Cyprus. Alexander Helios receives Armenia and Media; to Cleopatra Selene II he gives the kingdoms of Cyrenaica and Libya. His youngest son Ptolemy Philadelphus receives the Egyptian possessions in Phoenicia, Syria and Cilicia. Antony establishes Cleopatra as a Hellenistic monarch at Alexandria and gives her the title of "Queen of Kings".

=== 33 BC ===
==== By place ====
====== Roman Republic ======
- Gaius Julius Caesar Octavian becomes consul for the second time. His partner is Lucius Volcatius Tullus. Octavian delivers a speech; de summa Republica in the Roman Senate, in which he subjects the Donations.
- The second term of the Second Triumvirate expires.
- Marcus Vipsanius Agrippa is self demoted to Aedile, and builds the Aqua Julia, one of the aqueducts on which Rome's water supply depends, as well as cleaning the Cloaca Maxima sewerage system.
- Mark Antony annexes the kingdom of Media and arranges the marriage of his son Alexander Helios with princess Iotapa, the daughter of king Artavasdes I.
- The Kinambroi surrender to Octavian.

====== China ======
- Crown Prince Ao ascends to the throne as Emperor Cheng of Han of the Han dynasty (until 7 BC).

=== 32 BC ===
==== By place ====
====== Roman Republic ======
- Gnaeus Domitius Ahenobarbus and Gaius Sosius become consuls of Rome.
- Spring – Final War of the Roman Republic: Mark Antony transfers his headquarters from Samos to Athens, where he assembles a fleet of 500 combat vessels and 300 transport ships, crewed by 150,000 men.
- Sparta under Caius Iulius Eurycles, whose father Antony had been ordered to be executed for piracy, declares his support for Octavian. Lappa (modern Argyroupoli) in Attica and Kydonia in Crete revolt against Cleopatra.
- July – The Roman Senate declares war upon Mark Antony and Cleopatra VII. Octavian Caesar is proclaimed dux and the West - Gallic and Spanish provinces, Africa, Sicily and Sardinia - swear an oath (sacramentum) of loyalty to him. In order to assure this oath, Octavian forces the high priest of the Vestal Virgins in Rome to hand over Antony's will, which contains information about the Roman-conquered territories as kingdoms and plans to build a tomb in Alexandria for him and Cleopatra.
- Winter – Antony distributes garrisons along the west coast of Greece, stations the fleet at Actium and establishes his headquarters at Patrae.
- Zacynthus is held by Gaius Sosius, and Methone (Messenia) by Bogud of the royal house of Mauretania, driven into exile by his brother Bocchus II.

=== 31 BC ===
==== By place ====
====== Roman Republic ======
- Augustus, then known as Imperator Caesar, becomes Roman Consul for the third time. Antony was designated as his colleague but is deposed from office, an action that Antony does not recognise. Elected in Antony's place is Marcus Valerius Messalla Corvinus; Antony's consulship is not recorded in some sources, as Valerius is marked instead as consul ordinarius.
- Octavian crosses the Strait of Otranto and lands with an army (15 legions) at Panormus in Dalmatia. He marches to Toryne in the south, and establishes a bridgehead at the Gulf of Ambracia.
- Marcus Vipsanius Agrippa sails with 300 war galleys to the western Peloponnese, and occupies strategic positions around the Gulf of Corinth to cut off Antony's line of communication.
- Antony, alerted by Octavian's presence, sets up camp on the southern shore, at the promontory of Actium. He dispatches a force to isolate the camp of Octavian in the valley of Louros.
- Agrippa storms Leucas, giving Octavian an anchorage and a second depot for his land supplies. He seizes the garrison at Patrae, and takes Antony's headquarters.
- Amyntas, king of Galatia, deserts with 2,000 cavalry to Octavian. One-third of Antony's oarsmen are lost to malnutrition, disease and desertion.
- September 2 – Roman Civil War: Battle of Actium: Off the western coast of Greece, Octavian Caesar defeats naval forces under Mark Antony and Cleopatra VII.
- The Egyptian fleet (60 warships), including Cleopatra's treasure ship, retreats to Taenarus. Antony transfers his flag to a smaller vessel and breaks through Octavian's line.
- Winter – Octavian (32 years old) takes court at Samos. After his decisive victory at Actium he builds Nicopolis; the city is populated by Greeks from settlements further inland.

====== Roman Palestine ======
- In the Judean Desert on an isolated rock plateau, fortress Masada is completed. Herod the Great builds an armory, barracks, storehouses and a palace.
- 31 BC Judea earthquake, earthquake mentioned in catalogues of historical earthquakes. It affected the Herodian Kingdom of Judea in the Holy Land.

==== By topic ====
====== Art ======
- The Hellenistic period ends (or AD 14 by some scholars).

=== 30 BC ===
==== By place ====
====== Roman Republic ======
- Gaius Julius Caesar Octavianus becomes consul for the fourth time. His partner is Marcus Licinius Crassus the Younger.
- Spring – Octavian leads his army to the Dardanelles, ships them across to Asia Minor and marches into Syria where Herod the Great sends him vows of loyalty and thousands of his own troops in support.
- Summer – Cornelius Gallus lands in Cyrene and occupies Paraetonium. Mark Antony storms the city walls and blockades the harbour, then retreats with his army (7 legions) to Egypt and receives the news that Pelusium has opened its gates to Octavian without resistance.
- July 31 – Battle of Alexandria: Mark Antony achieves a minor victory over Octavian's forces, but most of his army subsequently deserts, leading to his suicide.
- August 1 – Octavian Caesar captures Alexandria. This marks the official annexation of Ancient Egypt to the Roman Republic. Cleopatra evacuates her court and treasury to Berenice on the west coast of the Red Sea, but king Malchus of Nabatea attacks from the desert and burns the Egyptian ships.
- August 10 or 12 – With the death of Cleopatra, probably by suicide, in Alexandria and the probable murder soon afterwards of her son and nominal co-ruler Caesarion, the Ptolemaic dynasty, the last of Ancient Egypt, comes to an end. The first year of Octavian's reign in Egypt.
- The remaining children of Cleopatra are spared by Octavian and taken back in triumph; Octavia Minor raises Alexander Helios, Cleopatra Selene and Ptolemy Philadelphus in her household in Rome.
- Octavian claims Cleopatra's treasure in the mausoleum at the Taposiris Magna (Temple of Isis); he pays the salaries of his veteran legionaries and gives them land in Italy.

====== Asia ======
- First possible date for the invention of the wheelbarrow in history; as the 5th century Book of the Later Han states that the wife of the once poor and youthful imperial censor Bao Xuan of the Chinese Han dynasty helped him push a lu che back to his village during their feeble wedding ceremony, around this year.

== Significant people ==
- Mark Antony, Roman politician and general (83–30 BC)
- Pharaoh Cleopatra VII of Egypt (lived 70/69–30 BC, reigned 51–30 BC)
- Gaius Julius Caesar Octavianus, known in English as Octavian, Roman politician and general (63 BC–AD 14)
- Pharaoh Ptolemy XV Caesarion (lived 47–30 BC, reigned 44–30 BC)

== Births ==
39 BC

- Antonia the Elder, daughter of Mark Antony, grandmother of Nero and Messalina (d. bef. AD 25)
- Julia the Elder, daughter of Caesar Augustus (d. AD 14)

38 BC

- January 14 – Nero Claudius Drusus, Roman politician and military commander, future stepson of Augustus Caesar (d. 9 BC)
- Lucius Volusius Saturninus, Roman suffect consul (or 37 BC)

36 BC

- January 31 – Antonia Minor, daughter of Mark Antony and Octavia Minor, mother of the emperor Claudius
- Ptolemy Philadelphus, son of Cleopatra VII of Egypt and Mark Antony (d. 29 BC)
- Vipsania Agrippina, daughter of Marcus Vipsanius Agrippa and Pomponia Caecilia Attica (d. AD 20)

32 BC

- Marcus Valerius Messalla, Roman politician

31 BC

- Aristobulus IV, Jewish prince of Judea (d. 7 BC)
- Tiruvalluvar, Indian poet and philosopher

== Deaths ==
39 BC

- Quintus Labienus, Roman general (murdered)

38 BC

- Antiochus I, king of Commagene (b. c. 86 BC)
- Pacorus I, crown prince of Parthia (b. c. 63 BC)

37 BC

- Antigonus II Mattathias (Antigonus the Hasmonean) (executed by order of Mark Antony)
- Aristobulus II, king and high priest of Judea (66–63 BC; assassinated)
- Jing Fang, Chinese mathematician and music theorist (b. 78 BC)
- Orodes II, king of the Parthian Empire (b. 95 BC)
- Shangguan, Chinese empress of the Han Dynasty

36 BC

- Ariarathes X (or Eusebes Philadelphos), king of Cappadocia
- Aristobulus III, high priest of Jerusalem (Hasmonean dynasty)
- Zhizhi Chanyu, Chinese ruler of the Xiongnu Empire

35 BC

- Aristobulus III, high priest of Judea (drowned) (b. 53 BC)
- Sextus Pompeius, Roman general (executed) (b. 67 BC)

33 BC

- July 8 – Yuan of Han, Chinese emperor of the Han dynasty (b. 75 BC)
- Tiberius Claudius Nero, Roman politician and father of Tiberius (b. 85 BC)

32 BC

- March 31 – Titus Pomponius Atticus, Roman nobleman

31 BC

- Gnaeus Domitius Ahenobarbus, Roman general and politician
- Tarcondimotus I, Roman client king of Cilicia
- Hu Hanxie, chanyu of Xiongnu.

30 BC

- August 1 – Mark Antony, Roman consul and general (suicide) (b. 83 BC)
- c. August 12 – Cleopatra VII, queen of Ptolemaic Egypt (likely suicide) (b. 69 BC)
- August 23 – Marcus Antonius Antyllus, son of Mark Antony and Fulvia (executed) (b. 47 BC)
- c. August 29 – Ptolemy Caesar, son of Julius Caesar and Cleopatra of Egypt, co-ruler of Egypt (likely assassinated) (b. 47 BC)
- Hyrcanus II, king and high priest of Judea (until 40 BC)
- Marcus Aemilius Lepidus Minor, Roman politician
- Pharnavaz II, king of Iberia (Artaxiad dynasty) (Georgia) (killed by Mirian II)
- Publius Canidius Crassus, Roman general and politician (executed)
- Emperor Sujin of Japan, according to legend.
