= 60s BC =

Decade

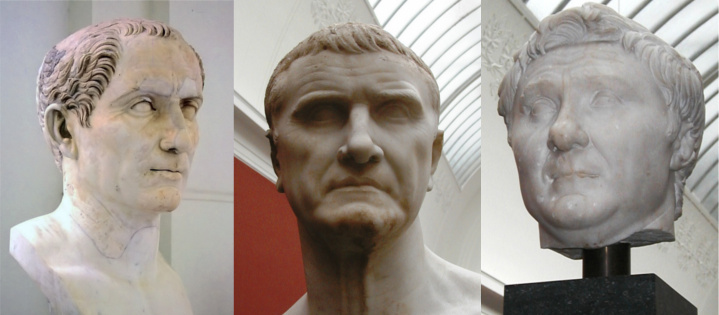
On 60 BC, the First Triumvirate is formed between Julius Caesar, Crassus and Pompey.

The 60s BC were the period 69 BC – 60 BC.

== Events ==
=== 69 BC ===
==== By place ====
====== Roman Republic ======
- October 6 – Roman Republic troops under Lucius Lucullus defeat the army of Tigranes II of Armenia in the Battle of Tigranocerta, and capture Tigranocerta, capital of Armenia.
- Consuls: Quintus Caecilius Metellus Creticus and Quintus Hortensius.
- Antiochus XIII Asiaticus is installed as king of Syria.
- Parthians and Romans re-establish Euphrates as a frontier.
- Gaius Julius Caesar is a quaestor in Spain.

====== Egypt ======
- Ptolemy XII deposes Cleopatra V, and becomes sole ruler.

====== Greece ======
- Kydonia, an ancient city on the island of Crete falls to Roman military forces.
- Rhodes becomes a bulwark against pirates, the Rhodians are unable to suppress piracy in the Aegean Sea. Delos gets the status of a free port.

=== 68 BC ===
==== By place ====
====== Roman Republic ======
- Consuls: Lucius Caecilius Metellus and Quintus Marcius Rex.
- October 6 – Lucius Lucullus defeats Tigranes II of Armenia in the Battle of Artaxata.
- Gaius Antonius Hybrida elected praetor.
- Tribune of the plebs Gaius Antius Restio passes the Lex Antia sumptuaria law forbidding Roman magistrates from attending banquets.
- Ostia, the harbour city of Ancient Rome, is sacked by pirates. The port is set on fire and the consular war fleet is destroyed.

====== Osroene ======
- Abgar II becomes ruler of Osroene.

=== 67 BC ===
==== By place ====
====== Roman Republic ======
- Consuls: Manius Acilius Glabrio and Gaius Calpurnius Piso.
- During Pompey's war against the pirates, he raises a fleet of 500 warships and fights with great success.
- The lex Gabinia gives Pompey command of the Mediterranean and its coasts for 50 miles inland for three years. He defeats the pirates in three months and pacifies Cilicia.
- Pompey divides the Mediterranean into 13 zones – six in the West and seven in the East – to each of which he assigns a fleet under an admiral.
- Pompey offers the ex-pirates and their families clemency, he settles them in agricultural colonies in eastern Mediterranean lands.
- Pompey takes over the command of Lucius Licinius Lucullus in the war against Mithridates VI of Pontus, and reaps the fruit of the latter's victories.
- Lex Acilia Calpurnia: permanent exclusion from office in cases of electoral corruption.
- Lex Roscia theatralis.
- Julius Caesar reconciles with Pompey and Crassus
- Julius Caesar marries Pompeia, a granddaughter of Sulla

====== Judea ======
- Hyrcanus II becomes king of Judea, for first time (until 66 BC), upon the death of his mother, Salome Alexandra.

====== Pontus ======
- Mithridates VI invades Pontus and defeats a Roman army at the Battle of Zela.
- After his victory at Zela, Mithridates starts consolidating his power in Pontus; restoring his rule over his old kingdom.
- Lucullus returnes to Pontus, but his troops refuse to campaign for him any longer and he withdrew to Galatia.

====== China ======
- December – The army of the Han dynasty Chinese commander Zheng Ji is victorious over the Xiongnu in the Battle of Jushi.

=== 66 BC ===
==== By place ====
====== Roman Republic ======
- Consuls: Manius Aemilius Lepidus and Lucius Volcatius Tullus.
- Catiline accused of conspiring against the Roman Republic with Autronius and the younger Sulla (also in 63 BC during the consulship of Cicero).
- The alliance between Mithridates VI of Pontus and Tigranes II of Armenia is broken.
- Tigranes II is forced to surrender, by a payment of 6,000 talents, and is reinstated by Pompey as a "friend of the Roman people" to hold Armenia as a buffer zone.
- Battle of the Lycus: Pompey the Great decisively defeats Mithridates VI, effectively ending the Third Mithridatic War.
- Gaius Antonius elected Roman praetor.
- The lex Manilia, supported by Cicero gives Pompey command over all of Asia.
- Cicero becomes praetor in Rome.

====== Judea ======
- Aristobulus II becomes king and high priest of Judea, until 63 BC.

=== 65 BC ===
==== By place ====
====== Roman Republic ======
- In response to the illegal exercise of citizen rights by foreigners, the Roman Senate passes the Lex Papia, which expels all foreigners from Rome
- Tigranes of Armenia is defeated and captured by Pompey, thus ending all hostilities on the northeastern frontier of Rome.
- Pompey the Great subjugates the kingdom of Iberia and makes Colchis a Roman province.

====== Western Han Empire ======
- 9th year of the reign of Emperor Xuan of Han

=== 64 BC ===
==== By place ====
====== Roman Republic ======
- Pompey destroys the kingdom of Pontus; king Mithridates VI commits suicide after escaping to the Crimea.
- Pompey annexes Syria and captures Jerusalem, annexing Judea.

====== Syria ======
- King Antiochus XIII Asiaticus is deposed and killed by the Syrian chieftain Sampsiceramus I – this is considered by some the end of the Seleucid dynasty.

=== 63 BC ===
==== By place ====
====== Roman Republic ======
- Lucullus holds a triumph, then retires from war and politics to live a life of refined luxury.
- Establishment of the Decapolis and Year 1 of the Pompeian era.
- Pompey conquers the people of Phonecia, Coele-Syria, and Judea for the Roman Republic.
- Roman annexation of the Seleucid Empire and of Judea as a client kingdom. King Judah Aristobulus II removed from power, while his brother John Hyrcanus II is reappointed king (ethnarch) under Roman suzerainty and high priest, until 40 BC.
- Massacre of over 12,000 Jews on the Temple Mount in Jerusalem by Roman troops, in support of John Hyrcanus II against Aristobulus II.
- Julius Caesar is elected Pontifex Maximus and praetor for 62 BC.
- Marcus Tullius Cicero is senior consul. He is the first novus homo (new man) to be elected to the consulship in 31 years.
- Gaius Antonius Hybrida is junior consul.
- Cato the Younger is elected tribune of the people for 62 BC, taking office in early December 63 BC.
- Servilius Rullus, a Roman tribune, proposes an agrarian reform law.
- Second Catilinarian Conspiracy against the Roman Republic is foiled by Cicero.

====== Pontus ======
- Pharnaces II becomes King of Pontus.

=== 62 BC ===
==== By place ====
====== Roman Republic ======
- January 5 – The forces of the conspirator Catiline are defeated by the loyal Roman armies of Antonius Hybrida led by Marcus Petreius in the Battle of Pistoria.
- Julius Caesar divorces Pompeia, following the sacrilege of Publius Clodius Pulcher.
- Cicero delivers his Pro Archia Poeta in defense of Aulus Licinius Archias' claim to Roman citizenship.
- Cato the Younger, as tribune, presents a lex frumentaria (enacting a grain dole).
- Metellus Nepos, also tribune, leaves Rome.
- Caesar and Bibulus are praetors.

====== Commagene ======
- King Antiochus I Theos of Commagene builds his mountain-top tomb-sanctuary at Mount Nemrut.

=== 61 BC ===
==== By place ====
====== Roman Republic ======
- Pompey returns to Rome with a triumph in honor of his for victories in the eastern provinces.
- Marcus Pupius Piso Frugi as consul attempts to gain ratification of Pompey's Eastern Settlement.
- Julius Caesar becomes governor in Hispania and creates Legio X Gemina (3,500 men). He puts down the Callaici and Lusitani rebellions.

=== 60 BC ===
==== By place ====
====== Roman Republic ======
- Gaius Julius Caesar suppresses an uprising and conquers all of Lusitania for Rome.
- Creation of the First Triumvirate, an informal political alliance between Julius Caesar, Pompey the Great and Marcus Licinius Crassus (or 59 BC).

====== Syria ======
- The Seleucid Empire comes to an end with the last two emperors being murdered on orders from Rome.

====== China ======
- The Han dynasty government establishes the Protectorate of the Western Regions, the highest military position of a military commander on the Western frontier (Tarim Basin).

== Significant people ==
- Pompey, Roman general, (lived 106 BC–48 BC)
- Mithridates VI, King of Pontus, (lived 132 BC–63 BC)
- Philip II Philoromaeus
- Gaius Antonius Hybrida, elected praetor in 66 BC
- Cleopatra VII is born (69 BC–30 BC) and grows into a young girl passing age 9.

== Births ==
69 BC

- Cleopatra VII Philopator, queen of Egypt (d. 30 BC)
- Hyeokgeose, Korean king and founder of Silla (d. AD 4)
- Wang Zhengjun, empress of the Western Han dynasty (d. AD 13)

68 BC

- Arsinoe IV of Egypt, daughter of Ptolemy XII (and probably Cleopatra V) (d. 41 BC)

67 BC

- Arsinoe IV of Egypt, daughter of Ptolemy XII (and probably Cleopatra V) (d. 41 BC)
- Sextus Pompey, Roman general and governor (d. 35 BC)

66 BC

- Octavia (the Younger), grandniece of Julius Caesar (d. 11 BC)

65 BC

- December 8 – Horace, Roman poet (d. 8 BC)
- Gaius Asinius Pollio, Roman orator, poet and historian (d. AD 4)

64 BC

- Marcus Valerius Messalla Corvinus, Roman general and consul (d. AD 8)
- Nicolaus of Damascus, Jewish historian and philosopher (approximate date)
- Strabo, Greek philosopher and historian in Amaseia

63 BC

- September 23 – Augustus, first Roman Emperor (d. AD 14)
- Didymus Chalcenterus, Greek scholar and grammarian (approximate date) (d. c. AD 10)
- Marcus Vipsanius Agrippa, Roman statesman and general (d. 12 BC)

62 BC

- Ptolemy XIII Theos Philopator, king (pharaoh) of Egypt (d. 47 BC)

60 BC

- Curia, wife of Quintus Lucretius Vespillo (approximate date)
- Ptolemy XIV, king (pharaoh) of Egypt (or 59 BC)
- Tryphon, Greek grammarian (approximate date)
- Daeso, emperor of Dongbuyeo

== Deaths ==
69 BC

- Cleopatra II Selene, queen of Egypt
- Julia, wife of Gaius Marius (b. c. 130 BC)

68 BC

- Antiochus of Ascalon, Greek philosopher (b. c. 130 BC)
- Cornelia, wife of Julius Caesar (b. 94 BC)
- Huo Guang, official of the western Han Dynasty
- Lucius Caecillius Metellus, Roman consul

67 BC

- Lucius Cornelius Sisenna, Roman general and historian (b. c. 120 BC)
- Salome Alexandra, queen of Judea (b. 139 BC)

66 BC

- Licinius Macer, Roman annalist

65 BC

- Xiphares, son of Mithridates VI (b. c. 85 BC)

64 BC

- Antiochus XIII Asiaticus, king of the Seleucid Empire

63 BC

- Mithridates VI, King of Pontus (b. 135 BC)
- Quintus Caecilius Metellus Pius, pontifex maximus and general (b. c. 130 BC or 127 BC)
- Those involved in the organisation of the Catilinarian conspiracy in Rome, including Publius Cornelius Lentulus Sura

62 BC

- Lucius Sergius Catilina, Roman politician (b. 108 BC)
- Quintus Roscius Gallus, Roman actor (b. c. 126 BC)
- Zhang Anshi, Chinese official of the Han Dynasty

61 BC

- Quintus Marcius Rex, Roman consul and general

60 BC

- Aretas III Philhellen, king of Nabatea (approximate date)
- Su Wu, Chinese diplomat and statesman (b. 140 BC)
