= 62 BC =

62 BC in various calendars
- Gregorian calendar: 62 BC; LXII BC
- Ab urbe condita: 692
- Ancient Egypt era: XXXIII dynasty, 262
- Pharaoh: Ptolemy XII Auletes, 19
- Ancient Greek Olympiad (summer): 179th Olympiad, year 3
- Assyrian calendar: 4689
- Balinese saka calendar: N/A
- Bengali calendar: −655 – −654
- Berber calendar: 889
- Buddhist calendar: 483
- Burmese calendar: −699
- Byzantine calendar: 5447–5448
- Chinese calendar: 戊午年 (Earth Horse); 2636 or 2429 — to — 己未年 (Earth Goat); 2637 or 2430
- Coptic calendar: −345 – −344
- Discordian calendar: 1105
- Ethiopian calendar: −69 – −68
- Hebrew calendar: 3699–3700
- Hindu calendars
- Vikram Samvat: −5 – −4
- Shaka Samvat: N/A
- Kali Yuga: 3039–3040
- Holocene calendar: 9939
- Iranian calendar: 683 BP – 682 BP
- Islamic calendar: 704 BH – 703 BH
- Javanese calendar: N/A
- Julian calendar: N/A
- Korean calendar: 2272
- Minguo calendar: 1973 before ROC 民前1973年
- Nanakshahi calendar: −1529
- Seleucid era: 250/251 AG
- Thai solar calendar: 481–482
- Tibetan calendar: ས་ཕོ་རྟ་ལོ་ (male Earth-Horse); 65 or −316 or −1088 — to — ས་མོ་ལུག་ལོ་ (female Earth-Sheep); 66 or −315 or −1087

Year 62 BC was a year of the pre-Julian Roman calendar. At the time it was known as the Year of the Consulship of Silanus and Murena (or, less frequently, year 692 Ab urbe condita). The denomination 62 BC for this year has been used since the early medieval period, when the Anno Domini calendar era became the prevalent method in Europe for naming years.

== Events ==
=== By place ===
==== Roman Republic ====
- January 5 – The forces of the conspirator Catiline are defeated by the loyal Roman armies of Antonius Hybrida led by Marcus Petreius in the Battle of Pistoria.
- Julius Caesar divorces Pompeia, following the sacrilege of Publius Clodius Pulcher.
- Cicero delivers his Pro Archia Poeta in defense of Aulus Licinius Archias' claim to Roman citizenship.
- Cato the Younger, as tribune, presents a lex frumentaria (enacting a grain dole).
- Metellus Nepos, also tribune, leaves Rome.
- Caesar and Bibulus are praetors.

==== Commagene ====
- King Antiochus I Theos of Commagene builds his mountain-top tomb-sanctuary at Mount Nemrut.

== Births ==
- Ptolemy XIII Theos Philopator, king (pharaoh) of Egypt (d. 47 BC)

== Deaths ==
- Lucius Sergius Catilina, Roman politician (b. 108 BC)
- Quintus Roscius Gallus, Roman actor (b. c. 126 BC)
- Zhang Anshi, Chinese official of the Han dynasty
