= 30 BC =

30 BC in various calendars
- Gregorian calendar: 30 BC; XXX BC
- Ab urbe condita: 724
- Ancient Egypt era: XXXIII dynasty, 294
- Pharaoh: Cleopatra VII, 22
- Ancient Greek Olympiad (summer): 187th Olympiad, year 3
- Assyrian calendar: 4721
- Balinese saka calendar: N/A
- Bengali calendar: −623 – −622
- Berber calendar: 921
- Buddhist calendar: 515
- Burmese calendar: −667
- Byzantine calendar: 5479–5480
- Chinese calendar: 庚寅年 (Metal Tiger); 2668 or 2461 — to — 辛卯年 (Metal Rabbit); 2669 or 2462
- Coptic calendar: −313 – −312
- Discordian calendar: 1137
- Ethiopian calendar: −37 – −36
- Hebrew calendar: 3731–3732
- Hindu calendars
- Vikram Samvat: 27–28
- Shaka Samvat: N/A
- Kali Yuga: 3071–3072
- Holocene calendar: 9971
- Iranian calendar: 651 BP – 650 BP
- Islamic calendar: 671 BH – 670 BH
- Javanese calendar: N/A
- Julian calendar: 30 BC; XXX BC
- Korean calendar: 2304
- Minguo calendar: 1941 before ROC 民前1941年
- Nanakshahi calendar: −1497
- Seleucid era: 282/283 AG
- Thai solar calendar: 513–514
- Tibetan calendar: ལྕགས་ཕོ་སྟག་ལོ་ (male Iron-Tiger); 97 or −284 or −1056 — to — ལྕགས་མོ་ཡོས་ལོ་ (female Iron-Hare); 98 or −283 or −1055

Year 30 BC was either a common year starting on Wednesday, Thursday or Friday or a leap year starting on Thursday of the Julian calendar (the sources differ, see leap year error for further information) and a common year starting on Wednesday of the Proleptic Julian calendar. At the time, it was known as the Year of the Consulship of Octavian and Crassus (or, less frequently, year 724 Ab urbe condita). The denomination 30 BC for this year has been used since the early medieval period, when the Anno Domini calendar era became the prevalent method in Europe for naming years.

== Events ==
=== By place ===
==== Roman Republic ====
- Gaius Julius Caesar Octavianus becomes consul for the fourth time. His partner is Marcus Licinius Crassus the Younger.
- Spring – Octavian leads his army to the Dardanelles, ships them across to Asia Minor and marches into Syria where Herod the Great sends him vows of loyalty and thousands of his own troops in support.
- Summer – Cornelius Gallus lands in Cyrene and occupies Paraetonium. Mark Antony storms the city walls and blockades the harbour, then retreats with his army (7 legions) to Egypt and receives the news that Pelusium has opened its gates to Octavian without resistance.
- July 31 – Battle of Alexandria: Mark Antony achieves a minor victory over Octavian's forces, but most of his army subsequently deserts, leading to his suicide.
- August 1 – Octavian Caesar captures Alexandria. This marks the official annexation of Ancient Egypt to the Roman Republic. Cleopatra evacuates her court and treasury to Berenice on the west coast of the Red Sea, but king Malchus of Nabatea attacks from the desert and burns the Egyptian ships.
- August 10 or 12 – With the death of Cleopatra, probably by suicide, in Alexandria and the probable murder soon afterwards of her son and nominal co-ruler Caesarion, the Ptolemaic dynasty, the last of Ancient Egypt, comes to an end. The first year of Octavian's reign in Egypt.
- The remaining children of Cleopatra are spared by Octavian and taken back in triumph; Octavia Minor raises Alexander Helios, Cleopatra Selene and Ptolemy Philadelphus in her household in Rome.
- Octavian claims Cleopatra's treasure in the mausoleum at the Taposiris Magna (Temple of Isis); he pays the salaries of his veteran legionaries and gives them land in Italy.

==== Egypt ====
- The Revolt of Thebes (c. 30–29 BC) outbreaks in Egypt immediately after Octavian's victory. Followed by a series of Egyptian resistances, military conflicts and revolts, the following centuries.

==== Asia ====
- First possible date for the invention of the wheelbarrow in history; as the 5th century Book of the Later Han states that the wife of the once poor and youthful imperial censor Bao Xuan of the Chinese Han dynasty helped him push a lu che back to his village during their feeble wedding ceremony, around this year.

== Deaths ==
- July 31 or August 1 – Imhotep-Pedubast, high priest of Ptah in Memphis (b.46 BC)
- August 1 – Mark Antony, Roman consul and general (suicide) (b. 83 BC)
- c. August 12 – Cleopatra VII, queen of Ptolemaic Egypt (likely suicide) (b. 69 BC)
- August 23 – Marcus Antonius Antyllus, son of Mark Antony and Fulvia (executed) (b. 47 BC)
- c. August 29 – Ptolemy Caesar, son of Julius Caesar and Cleopatra of Egypt, co-ruler of Egypt (likely assassinated) (b. 47 BC)
- Hyrcanus II, king and high priest of Judea (until 40 BC)
- Marcus Aemilius Lepidus Minor, Roman politician
- Pharnavaz II, king of Iberia (Artaxiad dynasty) (Georgia) (killed by Mirian II)
- Publius Canidius Crassus, Roman general and politician (executed)
- Emperor Sujin of Japan, according to legend.
