= Donations of Alexandria =

Land distribution by Mark Antony in 34 BC

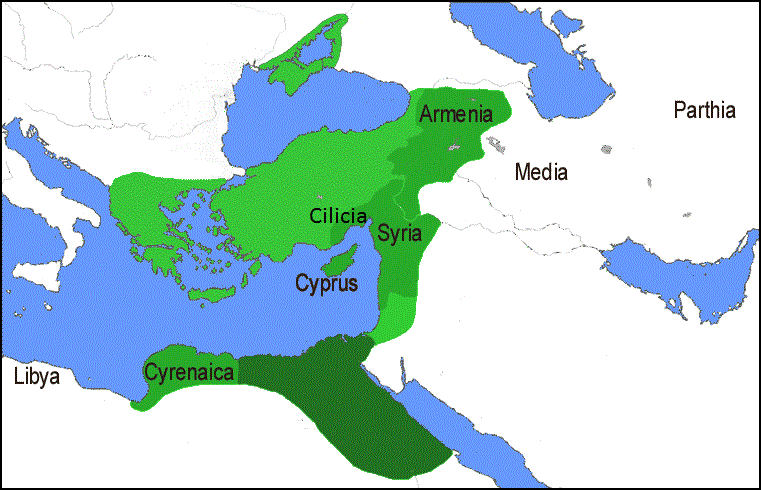
Map of the Donations of Alexandria (by Mark Antony to Cleopatra and her children) in 34 BC

The Donations of Alexandria (autumn 34 BC) was a political act by Cleopatra VII and Mark Antony in which they distributed lands held by Rome and the Parthian empire among Cleopatra's children and gave them many titles, especially for Caesarion, the son of Julius Caesar. This was the second of two such donations; a similar donation ceremony had taken place two years earlier at Antioch in 36 BC, at which time the donations enjoyed Octavian's full approval of the Antonine strategy of dominating the East by exploiting Cleopatra's unique royal Ptolemaic lineage in the donated territories. Ultimately, the Donations (of 34 BC) caused a fatal rupture in Antonine relations with Rome and were one of the causes of the final war of the Roman Republic.

== Background ==
The donations followed the failure of Antony's military campaign against Parthia. Antony tried to play up his military success against Armenia and downplay his defeat by Parthia by staging a festival imitating a Roman triumph to celebrate his victory over the Armenian leader Artavasdes, who was led through the city of Alexandria in captivity. Antony then held a public banquet at which he dressed up as the god Dionysus. The captured Armenian royal family were brought before Cleopatra VII to prostrate themselves, but they refused to do so, incurring her wrath.

== Donations ==
For the finale of the festivities, the whole city was summoned to the gymnasium of Alexandria, where Antony and Cleopatra, dressed as Dionysus-Osiris and Isis-Aphrodite respectively, sat on golden thrones. Caesarion was depicted as Horus, son of Isis. The children were similarly in the attire of their new kingdoms. Antony confirmed Cleopatra as queen of Egypt, Cyprus, Libya and central Syria.

The Donations themselves included:

- Alexander Helios was named king of Armenia, Media and Parthia;
- his twin Cleopatra Selene II got Cyrenaica and Libya;
- the young Ptolemy Philadelphus was awarded Syria, Phoenicia and Cilicia;
- Cleopatra was proclaimed Queen of Kings and Queen of Egypt, to rule with Caesarion (Ptolemy XV Caesar, son of Julius Caesar)
- Caesarion was proclaimed the son of the deified Julius Caesar (son of god), King of Kings and King of Egypt; Caesarion was declared the legitimate heir of Julius Caesar, despite the fact that Caesar himself had adopted Octavian (later known as Augustus) in his will and left him most of his fortune.

== Consequences ==
Antony sent an announcement of the donations to Rome, hoping that the Senate would approve them, but they refused. Octavian's political position was threatened by the recognition of Caesarion as the legitimate heir to Caesar's name. Octavian's base of power was his connection to Caesar through adoption, which gave him much-needed popularity and the loyalty of the legions. Octavian stepped up his personal attacks on Mark Antony and Cleopatra, and the Second Triumvirate expired on the last day of 33 BC, not to be renewed. Thus began the last war of the Roman Republic, with Octavian's victory ushering in the Imperial era.

== See also ==
- Alexandrian Kings
- Ptolemaic dynasty
- Battle of Actium
