= 31 BC Judea earthquake =

The 31 BC Judea earthquake is mentioned in catalogues of historical earthquakes. It affected the Herodian Kingdom of Judea in the Holy Land.

== Josephus' narrative ==
The main source on the earthquake is a passage in Antiquities of the Jews by Josephus. It dates the earthquake to the time of the Battle of Actium (31 BC) between the forces of Octavian and Mark Antony. It also dates the earthquake to the 7th regnal year of Herod the Great (reigned 37–4 BC). According to Josephus, the earthquake brought destruction to Judea's cattle. He estimates that about 10,000 men perished due to debris from falling houses.

The army of Judea reportedly suffered no harm, as it "lodged in the field" at the time of the earthquake. Arabians hostile to the Jews heard reports of the earthquake, and exaggerated the tale further to the point of reporting that Judea had fallen and that its men "were utterly destroyed". A number of Jewish ambassadors were slain by the Arabians, who believed that Judea could no longer oppose their army.

Josephus himself gives a similar account of the earthquake in The Jewish War, but there he claims that 30,000 people were casualties of the earthquake.

Josephus does not mention any destroyed or damaged localities. He claims that the army was spared the disaster by being out in the open, but the cattle were destroyed. But in Judea, the herds were either left in the open field or kept in "primitive pens". The army's survival may be explained by its distance from the earthquake's epicentre. Josephus connects the earthquake narrative to an Arab invasion from the east. According to his narrative, the Arab forces did not experience the earthquake first-hand and suffered no casualties. This suggests that the Arab army was also at a great enough distance from the epicentre to be unaffected.

Josephus' narrative does not identify the exact locations of the two opposing armies. But the earthquake narrative in the Antiquities follows the narrative of Herod's victory at Dion and Herod's defeat at Kanatha. Following these two battles, the Judean forces had retreated to either the mountains of Galilee or the mountains of Samaria. From there the Judean forces waged a successful guerrilla warfare campaign against their Arab opponents. Kanatha was located about 100 km (62 mi) east of Tiberias. There are two possible locations of Dion. One location is halfway between Kanatha and Tiberias, the other location is in the modern country of Jordan, about 25 km (16 mi) northeast of Pella, Jordan.

The "Judea" of Josephus' account may be equated with the relatively small area of the Kingdom of Judah, rather than the larger realm Herod had inherited from the Hasmonean dynasty. According to both Josephus and Pliny the Elder, the Judea known to the Romans had expanded to include Galilee, Samaria, Perea, Idumea, and Golan. Josephus uses the term Judea in both a narrow and a wider sense.

It is unclear from the narrative whether the earthquake affected the Negev and Arabah, sparsely populated areas where even a major impact might have escaped the notice of contemporaries.

In 30 BC, a year later, the victorious Octavian advanced across Roman Syria and the region of Judea to reach the Ptolemaic Kingdom in Egypt. Neither Josephus, nor other ancient sources mention Octavian encountering the devastation left by a major earthquake. Herod offered a "lavish reception" to Octavian, and provided supplies to the Roman army both in their journey towards Egypt, and in their return journey from Egypt, which suggests that Judea was far from devastated by this earthquake.

== John Malalas' narrative ==
Among Roman and Byzantine historians, the only one to mention this earthquake was John Malalas (6th century). In his narrative, the earthquake affected the city of "Salamine" in Israel. He dates the earthquake to the reign of Augustus (Octavian), and reports that Augustus rebuilt the city. Augustus reportedly renamed the city to "Diospolis".

The location of the city in the narrative is unclear. There were two cities called "Diospolis" in ancient Palestine. One was Dion (either the one in Golan or the one in Jordan), which was renamed following the conquest Pompey in 64/63 BC. The other Diospolis was the modern city of Lod, which received its Roman name by order of Septimius Severus in 199 AD. Malalas may have used a latter-day source for the name. However, neither city is called "Salamin" in ancient sources, and neither had known connections to Augustus.

Malalas may have confused the name of the city, giving a Greek name to various locations of the Levant called "Salem" or "Salam". An example is Dayr Abu Salama, where remnants of Greek inscriptions have been located. Another example is Tell Shalem/Salumnia, where a Roman military settlement has been located. It is considered improbable that Malalas made a geographic error and described more distant locations as cities in Palestine. Salamiyah was located about 250 km (160 mi) away from Dion-Golan. The Diopolis to the north of Laodicea was located about 100 km (62 mi) away. Salamis, Cyprus was destroyed by an earthquake during the reign of Constantius Chlorus (reigned 293–306), but it is considered unlikely that Malalas confused Cyprus with Palestine.

Another account by Malalas may suggest that the earthquake affected locations outside of Palestine. He reports that Marcus Vipsanius Agrippa visited Antioch c. 15 BC. Agrippa found that collapse rubble from old earthquakes had accumulated in the city's hippodrome, and ordered its removal. Pompey had orchestrated repairs in Antioch following the 64 BC Syria earthquake. The rubble which Agrippa found indicates that either Pompey's repairs were incomplete, or Antioch had suffered a second earthquake at some point between 64 and 15 BC. A connection between the 31 BC earthquake and the damages in Antioch is possible, though not supported by primary sources.

There are only three known earthquakes in the late 1st century BC. The 31 BC earthquake in Judea, a 27 BC earthquake in Phrygia, and a 17 BC earthquake in Cyprus. None of them is known to have affected Antioch.

== Other primary sources ==
Descriptions of this earthquake may have influenced earthquake accounts in Biblical apocrypha and pseudepigrapha. Earthquake narratives in 4 Ezra, 2 Baruch, and the Book of Shem have all been suggested to describe the earthquake. But they do not give explicit descriptions, and they lack "distinct historic clues". It is likely that these books used earthquakes as a metaphor.

The Megillah also contains an earthquake narrative which has been connected to the 31 BC earthquake. The narrative reports that Jonathan ben Uzziel used the prophets Haggai, Zechariah, and Malachi as sources for a targum. But this resulted in a great earthquake as divine punishment. A mysterious voice asked who dared to reveal such secrets to mankind.

Jonathan was a historical figure, who lived in the 1st to 2nd centuries AD. Haggai and Zechariah's works contain explicit references to earthquakes. Malachi's works contain veiled references to earthquakes. But the narrative in Megilla may not describe a historical earthquake. It is a cautionary tale about the dangers caused by the disclosure of holy texts to non-Jews.

The Book of Shem contains a prediction about a severe earthquake which would affect Galilee, when the year stars in Libra. This gives an astrological reference to an earthquake taking place between September 24 and October 23. While it has been suggested that the text is describing the 31 BC earthquake, this seems far-fetched.

The Dead Sea Scrolls also contain several references to earthquakes. Scholars have identified 16 explicit references to earthquakes, 6 literary allusions to earthquakes, and 5 instructions about constructing building foundations which will survive an earthquake. While some modern scholars have suggested a connection between these texts and the 31 BC earthquake, the texts never indicate any dated earthquake event. The writers of the scrolls may have simply recorded information about earthquakes in their collective memory. This is not enough evidence to suggest that the writers had traumatic experiences in an earthquake.

Archaeologists have located possible signs of earthquake damage at Qumran. These include an earthquake fault across one of the ritual baths, the fallen ceiling of a pantry, damage to the main tower, and collapse of rooms in the southeastern part of the site. It has been suggested that Qumran was abandoned following an earthquake, and there have been correlations with the 31 BC earthquake as described by Josephus.

However, the same damage may be attributed to human-caused damage to Qumran. Various theories suggest that Qumran may have been attacked by Aristobulus II or Hyrcanus II between 67 and 63 BC, attacked by Aulus Gabinius in 57 BC, attacked by the Parthian Empire in 40/39 BC, and attacked by Antigonus II Mattathias between 40 and 37 BC.

Archaeologists have searched for damage caused by the 31 BC earthquake at Masada and Jericho, at Agappias (identified with Anthedon), at Ashkelon, at Antipatris, and at Tiberias. It has been assumed that some of the intense building activities of Herod the Great may have been motivated by a need for post-earthquake repairs.

So far, much of the search for archaeological evidence for this earthquake has been fruitless. The search in Tiberias may have been misguided, as the city was not even built at the time of the earthquake. The city was constructed by Herod Antipas in 18 AD, and named after then-reigning Roman emperor Tiberius (reigned 14–37 AD).

The lack of archaeological evidence suggests that this was a relatively modest earthquake in the range of 6–6.5 moment magnitude scale, and not a "major catastrophe".

== Geological evidence ==
Seismites have been examined within the Holocene lacustrine Ze'elim Formation in the Dead Sea basin that has become exposed due to retreat of the sea over the last 60 years. The seismites take the form of soft sediment deformation structures, thought to be the result of significant earthquake-related shaking of unconsolidated sediment close to the sediment-lake interface. At the Ze'elim Terrace a series of seismites are recognised that have been dated using radiocarbon techniques from organic detritus included in the sequence. The second oldest seismite at the location has been correlated with the 31 BC earthquake. A seismite of the same estimated age has been described from the Darga fan delta site further north in the basin. A possible surface rupture along the Jericho Fault associated with the 31 BC event has also reported near the city of Jericho.
