= Alexandrian Kings =

Alexandrian Kings is a 1912 Greek poem by Constantine P. Cavafy which can be generally seen as a lesser-known poem from his anthology. He wrote this poem in the Spring of 1912 and was published soon after, in July 1912. This work is based on Cavafy's appreciation for Ancient history, specifically that of Ancient Greece and Ancient Egypt. The poem is set during Cleopatra’s reign in Alexandria, as the name suggests.

== Story ==
“Alexandrian Kings” follows the grand debut of Cleopatra’s children: Alexander, Ptolemaios Philadelphos and Kaisarion, in 34 B.C Alexandria. Alexander and Ptolemaios Philadelphos were both sons of the famous Mark Antony; whereas, Kaisarion was the son of the Emperor Julius Caesar. Cleopatra assumes the role of the tragic hero. In this grand debut, she showcases her prosperity through her theatrics in the hopes of winning over the Alexandrian people but she is only rewarded with cynicism and disbelief. She is meant to represent the beginning of the end for the Ptolemaic Dynasty.

This work, although it depicts the extravagant lifestyle Cleopatra was perceived as leading (through the eyes of the poet Cavafy), also carries a bitter history with it. Only 4 years after the events of this poem Antony and Cleopatra were presumed dead by suicide. Kaisarion was executed, most scholars believing that it was death by asphyxiation, yet the exact circumstances of his death, are yet to be confirmed. The two younger sons were taken as hostages back to Rome. After this, they were not documented on any historical records and their deaths remain unknown, but they were presumed dead from illness in captivity.

=== Excerpt ===
Original Greek	Transliteration	English Translation
Αλλά η μέρα ήτανε ζέστη και ποιητική, ο ουρανός ένα γαλάζιο ανοιχτό, το Αλεξανδρινό Γυμνάσιο ένα θριαμβικό κατόρθωμα της Τέχνης, των αυλικών η πολυτέλεια έκτακτη, ο Καισαρίων όλο χάρις κι εμορφιά…	Allá i méra ítane zésti kai poitikí, o ouranós éna galázio anoichtó, to Alexandrinó Gymnásio éna thriamvikó katórthoma tis Téchnis, ton avlikón i politéleia éktakti, o Kaisaríon ólo cháris ki emorfiá…	But the day was warm and poetic, the sky a pale blue, the Alexandrian Gymnasium a complete artistic triumph, the courtiers wonderfully sumptuous, Kaisarion all grace and beauty…

== Irony ==
As is the case in many poems by Cavafy, irony is used to highlight the misfortunates and demonstrate the mistakes of historical figures. In the case of "Alexandrian Kings," the poet uses plenty of irony to emphatically demonstrate the negative attitude he has towards Cleopatra's decisions on her unrightful inheritance.

There are elements of tragedy, drama and irony in this poem. The tragic irony lies in the fact that both Cleopatra and her children who unwittingly participate in the ceremony, are unaware of the dire fate that awaits them. Reading the distinct description of Caesarion and his luxurious clothes, one cannot help but think that only four years remain until his assassination. Cavafy essentially wants to highlight the futility of amibiton and the love of power that a political leader can possess. Cleopatra, in her attempt to demonstrate her power, set in motion a series of inescapable events that would soon end her own life and the life of her children.

The dramatic irony that arises from the contrast between the pursuits of the protagonists and their final outcome is made evident by the fact that while Cleopatra organizes this donation ceremony to impress the citizens of Alexandria, they are not at all convinced and are even fully aware of how meaningless it is.

Verbal irony is used by Cavafy to indicate the emptiness of the titles attributed to Cleopatra's children and is realized by the repetition of the phrase "they said." The use of a hyphen after each name calls for a pause in reading as if something important is going to be heard next, even though everyone in the city of Alexandria knew that all these lands didn't truly belong to Cleopatra or her children.
