= 63 BC =

63 BC in various calendars
- Gregorian calendar: 63 BC; LXIII BC
- Ab urbe condita: 691
- Ancient Egypt era: XXXIII dynasty, 261
- Pharaoh: Ptolemy XII Auletes, 18
- Ancient Greek Olympiad (summer): 179th Olympiad, year 2
- Assyrian calendar: 4688
- Balinese saka calendar: N/A
- Bengali calendar: −656 – −655
- Berber calendar: 888
- Buddhist calendar: 482
- Burmese calendar: −700
- Byzantine calendar: 5446–5447
- Chinese calendar: 丁巳年 (Fire Snake); 2635 or 2428 — to — 戊午年 (Earth Horse); 2636 or 2429
- Coptic calendar: −346 – −345
- Discordian calendar: 1104
- Ethiopian calendar: −70 – −69
- Hebrew calendar: 3698–3699
- Hindu calendars
- Vikram Samvat: −6 – −5
- Shaka Samvat: N/A
- Kali Yuga: 3038–3039
- Holocene calendar: 9938
- Iranian calendar: 684 BP – 683 BP
- Islamic calendar: 705 BH – 704 BH
- Javanese calendar: N/A
- Julian calendar: N/A
- Korean calendar: 2271
- Minguo calendar: 1974 before ROC 民前1974年
- Nanakshahi calendar: −1530
- Seleucid era: 249/250 AG
- Thai solar calendar: 480–481
- Tibetan calendar: མེ་མོ་སྦྲུལ་ལོ་ (female Fire-Snake); 64 or −317 or −1089 — to — ས་ཕོ་རྟ་ལོ་ (male Earth-Horse); 65 or −316 or −1088

Year 63 BC was a year of the pre-Julian Roman calendar. At the time it was known as the Year of the Consulship of Cicero and Hybrida (or, less frequently, year 691 Ab urbe condita). The denomination 63 BC for this year has been used since the early medieval period, when the Anno Domini calendar era became the prevalent method in Europe for naming years.

== Events ==
=== By place ===
==== Roman Republic ====
- Lucullus holds a triumph, then retires from war and politics to live a life of refined luxury.
- Establishment of the Decapolis and Year 1 of the Pompeian era.
- Pompey conquers the people of Phonecia, Coele-Syria, and Judea for the Roman Republic.
- Roman annexation of the Seleucid Empire and of Judea as a client kingdom. King Judah Aristobulus II removed from power, while his brother John Hyrcanus II is reappointed king (ethnarch) under Roman suzerainty and high priest, until 40 BC.
- Massacre of over 12,000 Jews on the Temple Mount in Jerusalem by Roman troops, in support of John Hyrcanus II against Aristobulus II.
- Julius Caesar is elected Pontifex Maximus and praetor for 62 BC.
- Marcus Tullius Cicero is senior consul. He is the first novus homo (new man) to be elected to the consulship in 31 years.
- Gaius Antonius Hybrida is junior consul.
- Cato the Younger is elected tribune of the people for 62 BC, taking office in early December 63 BC.
- Servilius Rullus, a Roman tribune, proposes an agrarian reform law.
- Second Catilinarian Conspiracy against the Roman Republic is foiled by Cicero.

==== Pontus ====
- Pharnaces II becomes King of Pontus.

== Births ==
- September 23 – Augustus, first Roman Emperor (d. AD 14)
- Didymus Chalcenterus, Greek scholar and grammarian (approximate date) (d. c. AD 10)
- Marcus Vipsanius Agrippa, Roman statesman and general (d. 12 BC)

== Deaths ==
- Mithridates VI, King of Pontus (b. 135 BC)
- Quintus Caecilius Metellus Pius, pontifex maximus and general (b. c. 130 BC or 127 BC)
- Those involved in the organisation of the Catilinarian conspiracy in Rome, including Publius Cornelius Lentulus Sura
