= AD 97 =

AD 97 in various calendars
- Gregorian calendar: AD 97; XCVII
- Ab urbe condita: 850
- Assyrian calendar: 4847
- Balinese saka calendar: 18–19
- Bengali calendar: −497 – −496
- Berber calendar: 1047
- Buddhist calendar: 641
- Burmese calendar: −541
- Byzantine calendar: 5605–5606
- Chinese calendar: 丙申年 (Fire Monkey); 2794 or 2587 — to — 丁酉年 (Fire Rooster); 2795 or 2588
- Coptic calendar: −187 – −186
- Discordian calendar: 1263
- Ethiopian calendar: 89–90
- Hebrew calendar: 3857–3858
- Hindu calendars
- Vikram Samvat: 153–154
- Shaka Samvat: 18–19
- Kali Yuga: 3197–3198
- Holocene calendar: 10097
- Iranian calendar: 525 BP – 524 BP
- Islamic calendar: 541 BH – 540 BH
- Javanese calendar: N/A
- Julian calendar: AD 97; XCVII
- Korean calendar: 2430
- Minguo calendar: 1815 before ROC 民前1815年
- Nanakshahi calendar: −1371
- Seleucid era: 408/409 AG
- Thai solar calendar: 639–640
- Tibetan calendar: མེ་ཕོ་སྤྲེ་ལོ་ (male Fire-Monkey); 223 or −158 or −930 — to — མེ་མོ་བྱ་ལོ་ (female Fire-Bird); 224 or −157 or −929

AD 97 (XCVII) was a common year starting on Sunday of the Julian calendar. At the time, it was known as the Year of the Consulship of Augustus and Rufus (or, less frequently, year 850 Ab urbe condita). The denomination AD 97 for this year has been used since the early medieval period, when the Anno Domini calendar era became the prevalent method in Europe for naming years.

== Events ==
=== By place ===
==== Roman Empire ====
- October 28 – Emperor Nerva recalls his general Marcus Ulpius Trajanus, age 44, from the German frontier and is forced by the Praetorian Guard to adopt him as his successor.
- Tacitus advances to consulship.
- The Roman colony of Cuicul is started in Numidia.
- Gloucester, England is founded as Colonia Glevum Nervensis by the Romans.
- Nerva recognizes the Sanhedrin of Jamnia as an official governmental body of the Jews, and the patriarch or nasi is designated as the representative of the Jewish people in Rome.
- Sextus Julius Frontinus is appointed superintendent of the aqueducts (Curator Aquarum) in Rome. At least 10 aqueducts supply the city with 250 million US gallons (950,000 m^{3}) of water per day. The public baths use half the supply.

==== China ====
- Gan Ying, is sent as an emissary to Daquin (Rome), though he is turned back by the Parthians.

=== By topic ===
==== Religion ====
- Evaristus succeeds Pope Clement I as the fifth pope (according to Catholic tradition; none of the popes until the mid second century is certain).

== Deaths ==
- Lucius Verginius Rufus, Roman politician and general (b. AD 15)
- Timothy, Christian evangelist and saint (b. AD 17)
- Titus Petronius Secundus, Roman prefect (b. AD 40)
- Zhangde, Chinese empress of the Han dynasty
