= 69 BC =

69 BC in various calendars
- Gregorian calendar: 69 BC; LXIX BC
- Ab urbe condita: 685
- Ancient Egypt era: XXXIII dynasty, 255
- Pharaoh: Ptolemy XII Auletes, 12
- Ancient Greek Olympiad (summer): 177th Olympiad, year 4
- Assyrian calendar: 4682
- Balinese saka calendar: N/A
- Bengali calendar: −662 – −661
- Berber calendar: 882
- Buddhist calendar: 476
- Burmese calendar: −706
- Byzantine calendar: 5440–5441
- Chinese calendar: 辛亥年 (Metal Pig); 2629 or 2422 — to — 壬子年 (Water Rat); 2630 or 2423
- Coptic calendar: −352 – −351
- Discordian calendar: 1098
- Ethiopian calendar: −76 – −75
- Hebrew calendar: 3692–3693
- Hindu calendars
- Vikram Samvat: −12 – −11
- Shaka Samvat: N/A
- Kali Yuga: 3032–3033
- Holocene calendar: 9932
- Iranian calendar: 690 BP – 689 BP
- Islamic calendar: 711 BH – 710 BH
- Javanese calendar: N/A
- Julian calendar: N/A
- Korean calendar: 2265
- Minguo calendar: 1980 before ROC 民前1980年
- Nanakshahi calendar: −1536
- Seleucid era: 243/244 AG
- Thai solar calendar: 474–475
- Tibetan calendar: ལྕགས་མོ་ཕག་ལོ་ (female Iron-Boar); 58 or −323 or −1095 — to — ཆུ་ཕོ་བྱི་བ་ལོ་ (male Water-Rat); 59 or −322 or −1094

Year 69 BC was a year of the pre-Julian Roman calendar. At the time it was known as the Year of the Consulship of Hortensius and Metellus (or, less frequently, year 685 Ab urbe condita). The denomination 69 BC for this year has been used since the early medieval period, when the Anno Domini calendar era became the prevalent method in Europe for naming years.

== Events ==
=== By place ===
==== Roman Republic ====
- October 6 – Roman Republic troops under Lucius Lucullus defeat the army of Tigranes II of Armenia in the Battle of Tigranocerta, and capture Tigranocerta, capital of Armenia.
- Consuls: Quintus Caecilius Metellus Creticus and Quintus Hortensius.
- Antiochus XIII Asiaticus is installed as king of Syria.
- Parthians and Romans re-establish Euphrates as a frontier.
- Gaius Julius Caesar is a quaestor in Spain.

==== Egypt ====
- Ptolemy XII deposes Cleopatra V, and becomes sole ruler.

==== Greece ====
- Kydonia, an ancient city on the island of Crete falls to Roman military forces.
- Rhodes becomes a bulwark against pirates, the Rhodians are unable to suppress piracy in the Aegean Sea. Delos gets the status of a free port.

== Births ==
- Cleopatra VII Philopator, queen of Egypt (d. 30 BC)
- Hyeokgeose, Korean king and founder of Silla (d. AD 4)
- Wang Zhengjun, empress of the Western Han dynasty (d. AD 13)

== Deaths ==
- Cleopatra II Selene, queen of Egypt
- Julia, wife of Gaius Marius (b. c. 130 BC)
