= 83 BC =

83 BC in various calendars
- Gregorian calendar: 83 BC; LXXXIII BC
- Ab urbe condita: 671
- Ancient Egypt era: XXXIII dynasty, 241
- Pharaoh: Ptolemy IX Lathyros, 6
- Ancient Greek Olympiad (summer): 174th Olympiad, year 2
- Assyrian calendar: 4668
- Balinese saka calendar: N/A
- Bengali calendar: −676 – −675
- Berber calendar: 868
- Buddhist calendar: 462
- Burmese calendar: −720
- Byzantine calendar: 5426–5427
- Chinese calendar: 丁酉年 (Fire Rooster); 2615 or 2408 — to — 戊戌年 (Earth Dog); 2616 or 2409
- Coptic calendar: −366 – −365
- Discordian calendar: 1084
- Ethiopian calendar: −90 – −89
- Hebrew calendar: 3678–3679
- Hindu calendars
- Vikram Samvat: −26 – −25
- Shaka Samvat: N/A
- Kali Yuga: 3018–3019
- Holocene calendar: 9918
- Iranian calendar: 704 BP – 703 BP
- Islamic calendar: 726 BH – 725 BH
- Javanese calendar: N/A
- Julian calendar: N/A
- Korean calendar: 2251
- Minguo calendar: 1994 before ROC 民前1994年
- Nanakshahi calendar: −1550
- Seleucid era: 229/230 AG
- Thai solar calendar: 460–461
- Tibetan calendar: མེ་མོ་བྱ་ལོ་ (female Fire-Bird); 44 or −337 or −1109 — to — ས་ཕོ་ཁྱི་ལོ་ (male Earth-Dog); 45 or −336 or −1108

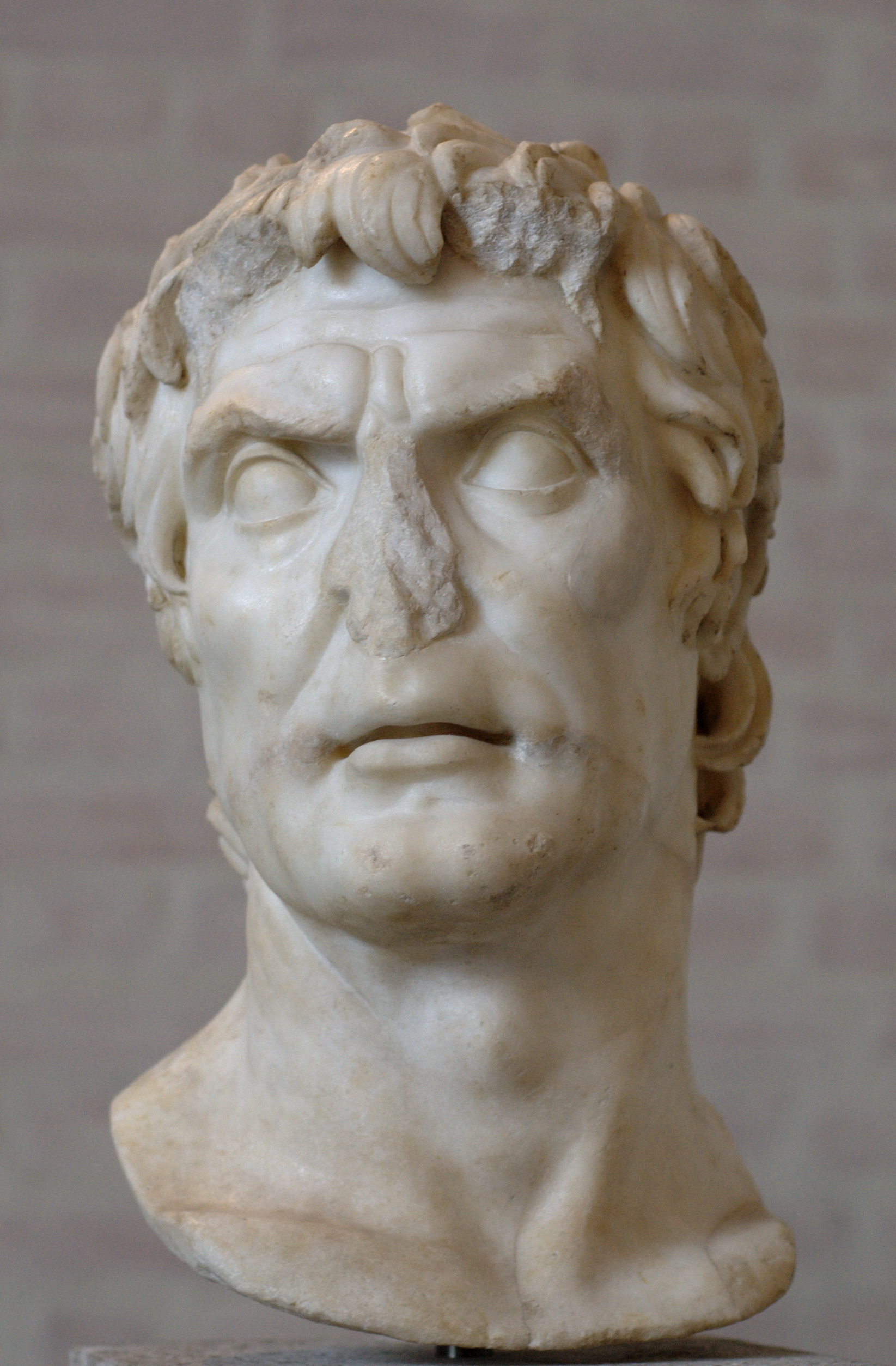
Lucius Cornelius Sulla

Year 83 BC was a year of the pre-Julian Roman calendar. At the time it was known as the Year of the Consulship of Asiaticus and Norbanus (or, less frequently, year 671 Ab urbe condita). The denomination 83 BC for this year has been used since the early medieval period, when the Anno Domini calendar era became the prevalent method in Europe for naming years.

== Events ==
=== By place ===
==== Roman Republic ====
- Spring – Lucius Cornelius Sulla returns to Italy from his campaigns in Greece and lands with his legions unopposed at Brundisium. He defeats the popular forces of Gaius Norbanus in the Battle of Mount Tifata.
- Gnaeus Pompeius, age 22, raises, on his own initiative, a private army of three legions from his father's veterans and clientelae in Picenum.
- Lucius Licinius Murena, the Roman governor of Asia, clashes with the Pontic forces of Mithridates VI, starting the Second Mithridatic War.
- A fire breaks out which burns down the Temple of Jupiter (Jupiter Capitolinus) and destroys the collection of Sibylline Books.
- Two new buildings were completed on the Capitoline Hill in Rome: the Temple of Jupiter Optimus Maximus and the Tabularium.

==== Syria ====
- Tigranes the Great, King of Armenia was invited by a faction in the Seleucid civil wars, entered Syria and effectively ended Seleucid rule. Though a weakened Seleucid monarchy was briefly restored after Roman victories, ongoing instability led Pompey to abolish the dynasty and annex Syria as a Roman province in 63 BC.

== Births ==
- Fulvia, Roman matron and wife of Mark Antony (approximate date)
- Julia, daughter of Julius Caesar and Cornelia
- Mark Antony, Roman politician and General (who later married Cleopatra) (approximate date) (d. 30 BC)

== Deaths ==
- Philip I Philadelphus, Seleucid king (approximate date)
