= 66 BC =

66 BC in various calendars
- Gregorian calendar: 66 BC; LXVI BC
- Ab urbe condita: 688
- Ancient Egypt era: XXXIII dynasty, 258
- Pharaoh: Ptolemy XII Auletes, 15
- Ancient Greek Olympiad (summer): 178th Olympiad, year 3
- Assyrian calendar: 4685
- Balinese saka calendar: N/A
- Bengali calendar: −659 – −658
- Berber calendar: 885
- Buddhist calendar: 479
- Burmese calendar: −703
- Byzantine calendar: 5443–5444
- Chinese calendar: 甲寅年 (Wood Tiger); 2632 or 2425 — to — 乙卯年 (Wood Rabbit); 2633 or 2426
- Coptic calendar: −349 – −348
- Discordian calendar: 1101
- Ethiopian calendar: −73 – −72
- Hebrew calendar: 3695–3696
- Hindu calendars
- Vikram Samvat: −9 – −8
- Shaka Samvat: N/A
- Kali Yuga: 3035–3036
- Holocene calendar: 9935
- Iranian calendar: 687 BP – 686 BP
- Islamic calendar: 708 BH – 707 BH
- Javanese calendar: N/A
- Julian calendar: N/A
- Korean calendar: 2268
- Minguo calendar: 1977 before ROC 民前1977年
- Nanakshahi calendar: −1533
- Seleucid era: 246/247 AG
- Thai solar calendar: 477–478
- Tibetan calendar: ཤིང་ཕོ་སྟག་ལོ་ (male Wood-Tiger); 61 or −320 or −1092 — to — ཤིང་མོ་ཡོས་ལོ་ (female Wood-Hare); 62 or −319 or −1091

Year 66 BC was a year of the pre-Julian Roman calendar. At the time it was known as the Year of the Consulship of Lepidus and Tullus (or, less frequently, year 688 Ab urbe condita). The denomination 66 BC for this year has been used since the early medieval period, when the Anno Domini calendar era became the prevalent method in Europe for naming years.

== Events ==
=== By place ===
==== Roman Republic ====
- Consuls: Manius Aemilius Lepidus and Lucius Volcatius Tullus.
- Catiline accused of conspiring against the Roman Republic with Autronius and the younger Sulla (also in 63 BC during the consulship of Cicero).
- The alliance between Mithridates VI of Pontus and Tigranes II of Armenia is broken.
- Tigranes II is forced to surrender, by a payment of 6,000 talents, and is reinstated by Pompey as a "friend of the Roman people" to hold Armenia as a buffer zone.
- Battle of the Lycus: Pompey the Great decisively defeats Mithridates VI, effectively ending the Third Mithridatic War.
- Gaius Antonius elected Roman praetor.
- The lex Manilia, supported by Cicero gives Pompey command over all of Asia.
- Cicero becomes praetor in Rome.

==== Judea ====
- Aristobulus II becomes king and high priest of Judea, until 63 BC.

== Births ==
- Octavia (the Younger), grandniece of Julius Caesar (d. 11 BC)

== Deaths ==
- Licinius Macer, Roman annalist
