= 108 BC =

108 BC in various calendars
- Gregorian calendar: 108 BC; CVIII BC
- Ab urbe condita: 646
- Ancient Egypt era: XXXIII dynasty, 216
- Pharaoh: Ptolemy IX Lathyros, 9
- Ancient Greek Olympiad (summer): 168th Olympiad (victor)¹
- Assyrian calendar: 4643
- Balinese saka calendar: N/A
- Bengali calendar: −701 – −700
- Berber calendar: 843
- Buddhist calendar: 437
- Burmese calendar: −745
- Byzantine calendar: 5401–5402
- Chinese calendar: 壬申年 (Water Monkey); 2590 or 2383 — to — 癸酉年 (Water Rooster); 2591 or 2384
- Coptic calendar: −391 – −390
- Discordian calendar: 1059
- Ethiopian calendar: −115 – −114
- Hebrew calendar: 3653–3654
- Hindu calendars
- Vikram Samvat: −51 – −50
- Shaka Samvat: N/A
- Kali Yuga: 2993–2994
- Holocene calendar: 9893
- Iranian calendar: 729 BP – 728 BP
- Islamic calendar: 751 BH – 750 BH
- Javanese calendar: N/A
- Julian calendar: N/A
- Korean calendar: 2226
- Minguo calendar: 2019 before ROC 民前2019年
- Nanakshahi calendar: −1575
- Seleucid era: 204/205 AG
- Thai solar calendar: 435–436
- Tibetan calendar: ཆུ་ཕོ་སྤྲེ་ལོ་ (male Water-Monkey); 19 or −362 or −1134 — to — ཆུ་མོ་བྱ་ལོ་ (female Water-Bird); 20 or −361 or −1133

108 BC was a year of the pre-Julian Roman calendar. At the time it was known as the Year of the Consulship of Galba and Hortensius/Scaurus (or, less frequently, year 646 Ab urbe condita) and the Third Year of Yuanfeng. The denomination 108 BC for this year has been used since the early medieval period, when the Anno Domini calendar era became the prevalent method in Europe for naming years.

== Events ==
=== By place ===
==== Roman Republic ====
- Roman forces under Quintus Caecilius Metellus Numidicus defeat the forces of Jugurtha of Numidia at the Battle of the Muthul, with Gaius Marius as a subordinate.

==== Asia ====
- Han conquest of Gojoseon

- The Han generals Yang Pu and Xun Zhi besiege Wangxian (Pyongyang), the capital of Gojoseon. Infighting between the generals leads Xun Zhi to arrest Yang Pu.
- Summer – After being deserted by some of his officials, king Ugeo of Gojoseon is assassinated. Cheng Yi takes over the defense of Wangxian but is killed by Han sympathizers.
- Han subjugates Gojoseon and divides it into four prefectures. Xun Zhi is executed for infighting.

- Emperor Wu of Han founds Jiuquan in the Hexi Corridor as a military outpost on the Silk Road to Central Asia. It serves to protect diplomats and merchants, and it cuts off the kings of the region from the Xiongnu. He also founds Xianlei in present-day Inner Mongolia, extending Han control further north than before.

== Births ==
- Lucius Sergius Catilina, Roman politician (d. 62 BC)

== Deaths ==
- Marcus Livius Drusus (the Elder), Roman consul
- Ugeo of Gojoseon, king of Wiman Joseon (Korea)
