= 130 BC =

130 BC in various calendars
- Gregorian calendar: 130 BC; CXXX BC
- Ab urbe condita: 624
- Ancient Egypt era: XXXIII dynasty, 194
- Pharaoh: Ptolemy VIII Physcon, 16
- Ancient Greek Olympiad (summer): 162nd Olympiad, year 3
- Assyrian calendar: 4621
- Balinese saka calendar: N/A
- Bengali calendar: −723 – −722
- Berber calendar: 821
- Buddhist calendar: 415
- Burmese calendar: −767
- Byzantine calendar: 5379–5380
- Chinese calendar: 庚戌年 (Metal Dog); 2568 or 2361 — to — 辛亥年 (Metal Pig); 2569 or 2362
- Coptic calendar: −413 – −412
- Discordian calendar: 1037
- Ethiopian calendar: −137 – −136
- Hebrew calendar: 3631–3632
- Hindu calendars
- Vikram Samvat: −73 – −72
- Shaka Samvat: N/A
- Kali Yuga: 2971–2972
- Holocene calendar: 9871
- Iranian calendar: 751 BP – 750 BP
- Islamic calendar: 774 BH – 773 BH
- Javanese calendar: N/A
- Julian calendar: N/A
- Korean calendar: 2204
- Minguo calendar: 2041 before ROC 民前2041年
- Nanakshahi calendar: −1597
- Seleucid era: 182/183 AG
- Thai solar calendar: 413–414
- Tibetan calendar: ལྕགས་ཕོ་ཁྱི་ལོ་ (male Iron-Dog) −3 or −384 or −1156 — to — ལྕགས་མོ་ཕག་ལོ་ (female Iron-Boar) −2 or −383 or −1155

Year 130 BC was a year of the pre-Julian Roman calendar. At the time it was known as the Year of the Consulship of Lentulus/Pulcher and Perperna (or, less frequently, year 624 Ab urbe condita) and the Fifth Year of Yuanguang. The denomination 130 BC for this year has been used since the early medieval period, when the Anno Domini calendar era became the prevalent method in Europe for naming years.

== Events ==
=== By place ===
==== Roman Republic ====
- Consul Marcus Perperna defeats Aristonicus in battle, besieges him at Stratonicea, dies at Pergamon.
- Roman census carried out by Quintus Pompeius and Quintus Caecilius Metellus Macedonicus.
- The tribune Gaius Papirius Carbo passes a measure allowing the use of secret ballots in legislative assemblies.

==== Egypt ====
- King Ptolemy VIII murders Ptolemy VII Neos Philopator or Ptolemy Memphites, the puppet ruler of Cleopatra II.

==== China ====
- Concubine Wei Zifu gives birth to Liu Ju, the future Crown Prince.

== Births ==
- Publius Servilius Vatia Isauricus, Roman consul (approximate date)
- Quintus Caecilius Metellus Pius, Roman consul and general (d. 63 BC) (approximate date)

== Deaths ==
- Appius Claudius Pulcher, Roman consul
- Ariarathes V, king of Cappadocia
- Marcus Perperna, Roman consul
- Pacuvius, Roman tragic poet (b. c. 220 BC)
- Ptolemaeus of Commagene, Seleucid satrap
