= 135 BC =

135 BC in various calendars
- Gregorian calendar: 135 BC; CXXXV BC
- Ab urbe condita: 619
- Ancient Egypt era: XXXIII dynasty, 189
- Pharaoh: Ptolemy VIII Physcon, 11
- Ancient Greek Olympiad (summer): 161st Olympiad, year 2
- Assyrian calendar: 4616
- Balinese saka calendar: N/A
- Bengali calendar: −728 – −727
- Berber calendar: 816
- Buddhist calendar: 410
- Burmese calendar: −772
- Byzantine calendar: 5374–5375
- Chinese calendar: 乙巳年 (Wood Snake); 2563 or 2356 — to — 丙午年 (Fire Horse); 2564 or 2357
- Coptic calendar: −418 – −417
- Discordian calendar: 1032
- Ethiopian calendar: −142 – −141
- Hebrew calendar: 3626–3627
- Hindu calendars
- Vikram Samvat: −78 – −77
- Shaka Samvat: N/A
- Kali Yuga: 2966–2967
- Holocene calendar: 9866
- Iranian calendar: 756 BP – 755 BP
- Islamic calendar: 779 BH – 778 BH
- Javanese calendar: N/A
- Julian calendar: N/A
- Korean calendar: 2199
- Minguo calendar: 2046 before ROC 民前2046年
- Nanakshahi calendar: −1602
- Seleucid era: 177/178 AG
- Thai solar calendar: 408–409
- Tibetan calendar: ཤིང་མོ་སྦྲུལ་ལོ་ (female Wood-Snake) −8 or −389 or −1161 — to — མེ་ཕོ་རྟ་ལོ་ (male Fire-Horse) −7 or −388 or −1160

Year 135 BC was a year of the pre-Julian Roman calendar. At the time it was known as the Year of the Consulship of Flaccus and Piso (or, less frequently, year 619 Ab urbe condita) and the Sixth Year of Jianyuan. The denomination 135 BC for this year has been used since the early medieval period, when the Anno Domini calendar era became the prevalent method in Europe for naming years.

== Events ==
=== By place ===
==== Roman Republic ====
- The First Servile War starts in Sicily.
- Servius Fulvius Flaccus defeats an uprising of the Ardiaei in Illyria.
- Marcus Cosconius defeats the Scordisci in Thrace.

==== Bactria ====
- Menander I, king of the Indo-Greek Kingdom dies and is succeeded by Epander.

==== China ====
- Grand Empress Dowager Dou dies, which allows her grandson Emperor Wu to exert greater control over the empire.
- Minyue attacks Nanyue, which are both vassal states of the Han dynasty. The Han send two armies against Minyue under Wang Hui and Han Anguo, and Minyue's king Zou Ying is killed by his brother Zou Yushan, who then surrenders to the Han.
- Emperor Wu makes Zou Chou the king of Minyue, but Zou Yushan carves out two thirds of Minyue as the state of Dongyue, which Wu then recognizes.
- A Han military campaign against the Dian Kingdom establishes a military commandery in the Yunnan region.

== Births ==
- Mithridates VI, king of Pontus (d. 63 BC)
- Pompeius Strabo, Roman consul and father of Pompeius Magnus (d. 87 BC)
- Posidonius of Apamea, Greek Stoic philosopher and scientist (d. 51 BC)
- Sima Qian, Chinese historian of the Han dynasty (approximate date)

== Deaths ==
- Menander I, king of the Indo-Greek Kingdom
- Simon Maccabaeus, prince of Judea and High Priest of Judea

== Bibliography ==
- Papazoglu, Fanula (1978). The Central Balkan Tribes in pre-Roman Times: Triballi, Autariatae, Dardanians, Scordisci and Moesians. Amsterdam: Hakkert. ISBN 978-90-256-0793-7.
