= 64 BC =

64 BC in various calendars
- Gregorian calendar: 64 BC; LXIV BC
- Ab urbe condita: 690
- Ancient Egypt era: XXXIII dynasty, 260
- Pharaoh: Ptolemy XII Auletes, 17
- Ancient Greek Olympiad (summer): 179th Olympiad (victor)¹
- Assyrian calendar: 4687
- Balinese saka calendar: N/A
- Bengali calendar: −657 – −656
- Berber calendar: 887
- Buddhist calendar: 481
- Burmese calendar: −701
- Byzantine calendar: 5445–5446
- Chinese calendar: 丙辰年 (Fire Dragon); 2634 or 2427 — to — 丁巳年 (Fire Snake); 2635 or 2428
- Coptic calendar: −347 – −346
- Discordian calendar: 1103
- Ethiopian calendar: −71 – −70
- Hebrew calendar: 3697–3698
- Hindu calendars
- Vikram Samvat: −7 – −6
- Shaka Samvat: N/A
- Kali Yuga: 3037–3038
- Holocene calendar: 9937
- Iranian calendar: 685 BP – 684 BP
- Islamic calendar: 706 BH – 705 BH
- Javanese calendar: N/A
- Julian calendar: N/A
- Korean calendar: 2270
- Minguo calendar: 1975 before ROC 民前1975年
- Nanakshahi calendar: −1531
- Seleucid era: 248/249 AG
- Thai solar calendar: 479–480
- Tibetan calendar: མེ་ཕོ་འབྲུག་ལོ་ (male Fire-Dragon); 63 or −318 or −1090 — to — མེ་མོ་སྦྲུལ་ལོ་ (female Fire-Snake); 64 or −317 or −1089

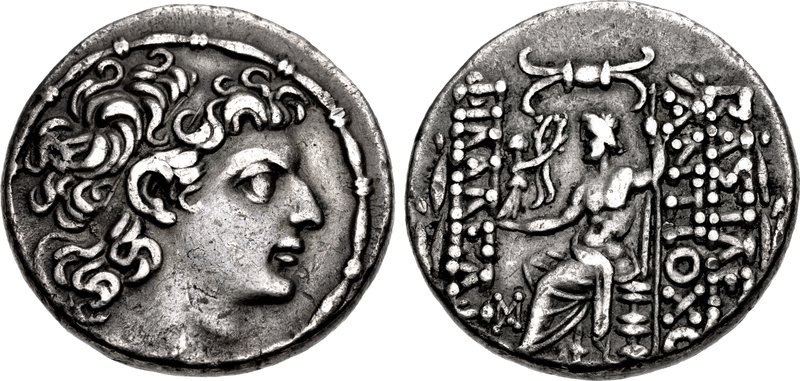
Coin of Antiochus XIII (r. 69–64 BC)

Year 64 BC was a year of the pre-Julian Roman calendar. At the time it was known as the Year of the Consulship of Caesar and Figulus (or, less frequently, year 690 Ab urbe condita). The denomination 64 BC for this year has been used since the early medieval period, when the Anno Domini calendar era became the prevalent method in Europe for naming years.

== Events ==
=== By place ===
==== Roman Republic ====
- Pompey destroys the kingdom of Pontus; king Mithridates VI commits suicide after escaping to the Crimea.
- Pompey annexes Syria and captures Jerusalem, annexing Judea.

==== Syria ====
- King Antiochus XIII Asiaticus is deposed and killed by the Syrian chieftain Sampsiceramus I – this is considered by some the end of the Seleucid dynasty.
- 64 BC Syria earthquake, mentioned in catalogues of historical earthquakes. It affected the region of Syria and may have caused structural damage in the city of Jerusalem.

== Births ==
- Marcus Valerius Messalla Corvinus, Roman general and consul (d. AD 8)
- Nicolaus of Damascus, Jewish historian and philosopher (approximate date)
- Strabo, Greek philosopher and historian in Amaseia

== Deaths ==
- Antiochus XIII Asiaticus, king of the Seleucid Empire
