= Bao Xuan =

1st century BC Western Han dynasty censor

Bao Xuan (Chinese: 鮑宣, died 3 AD), courtesy name Zidu (子都), was a Han dynasty censor during the reign of Emperor Ai, known for his integrity and courage. He was exiled for offending the grand councilor Kong Guang (孔光), and later died in prison for opposing Wang Mang (who usurped the throne in 9 AD).

Bao Xuan's (already raided) tomb was discovered in May 2007 in Zhangzi County, Shanxi, where he spent the last years of his life.

== Early life ==
Bao Xuan was from a poor family in Gaocheng (高城; roughly modern Yanshan County, Hebei). He studied Confucian classics under a wealthy scholar, who, recognizing Bao Xuan's outstanding diligence, betrothed his daughter Huan Shaojun (桓少君) to Bao Xuan. Mr. Huan also provided a sumptuous dowry, but this made Bao Xuan uncomfortable. He said to his new bride:

You are from a rich family, so you are used to luxury. But I'm from a poor family, so I cannot accept this gift.

Huan Shaojun replied:

My father married me to you because of your virtues and merits. Now that I'm your wife I will obey you without hesitation.

Bao Xuan was ecstatic. The young couple returned the garments, jewelry and servants to Huan Shaojun's father, and dressed in coarse clothing they pushed together a wheelbarrow with all their belongings back to Bao Xuan's village. Despite her aristocratic background, Huan Shaojun performed domestic chores and respected her in-laws with such modesty that the entire community praised her as an excellent wife.

Bao Xuan began his career as a lowly functionary in the local government. Later he went to neighboring Shuzhou (束州; roughly modern Dacheng County) and served as an aide (州丞) and a defender (都尉), before working in the labor section (功曹). He became a civil official after a recommendation through the xiaolian system, but an illness prevented him from assuming a post. Once he recovered, he worked as a retainer (從事) still in Shuzhou. He became a Court Gentleman for Consultation (議郎) in the imperial court through the recommendation of Wang Shang (王商), the Commander-in-Chief (大司馬), but left the post after another illness.

== As a censor ==
In 7 BC, Liu Xin (posthumously known as Emperor Ai) became the Han emperor. He Wu (何武), the Censor-in-Chief (大司空), valued Bao Xuan greatly and recommended him to the post of Grand Master of Remonstrance (諫大夫). A year later Bao Xuan was dismissed after Guo Qin (郭欽), the Director of Uprightness (丞相司直), accused him of misconduct and overstepping his boundaries during inspection tours. The charges were:

- Bao Xuan heard court cases in place of local officials
- Bao Xuan inspected too many items
- Bao Xuan rode in a cart led by only 1 horse as opposed to 6 horses, the standard
- Bao Xuan lodged in village hostels which drew gossip

None of the offenses was major, and Bao Xuan returned to the post a few months later. He was known to submit many memorials criticizing policies, "his writings bereft of rhetoric and abounding with facts".

By 3 BC the emperor's grandmother Consort Fu and mother Consort Ding were both made empresses dowager, and several members of the Fu and Ding clans were created marquesses. Those opposing them were removed from their offices one by one, including He Wu. But Bao Xuan was undaunted. He submitted a memorial to the throne which would later be referred to as the "Seven Deprivations and Seven Deaths" (七亡七死), in which he detailed the suffering of the common people at the hands of cruel landlords and oppressive government. In blunt language, Bao Xuan criticized the emperor for favoring the Fu and Ding clans and the minion Dong Xian, while ignoring the wealth they accumulated at the expense of common people. It was said the emperor was rather displeased but did not punish Bao Xuan as he was a "famous Confucian". Nor did he heed Bao Xuan's advice immediately.

An earthquake and a solar eclipse in 2 BC worked in Bao Xuan's favor. The emperor became fearful and dismissed many imperial relatives after Empress Dowager Fu died. Bao Xuan submitted another memorial criticizing Dong Xian and other sycophants in power, and this time the emperor took his advice and reinstalled He Wu and Peng Xuan (彭宣) to their old posts as two of the Three Ducal Ministers. Bao Xuan was appointed Director of Convict Labor (司隸).

== Exile and death ==
A few months later, the grand councilor Kong Guang (孔光) was on a tour in a national park when his retainers rode in the middle of the road, which was a crime at that time. Bao Xuan happened to witness it, so he ordered his followers to detain Kong Guang's retainers and confiscate their carts and horses. The furious Kong Guang sent a report to the Censorate (御史), which dispatched officials to the Directorate of Convict Labor to try to apprehend Bao Xuan. Bao Xuan shut the gate so the officials could not enter. This infuriated the emperor, who ordered Bao Xuan arrested and executed for "gross disrespect and immorality".

After Bao Xuan's arrest, a student in the imperial college named Wang Xian (王咸) wrote a banner that said: "Those who want to save Director Bao, stand under this banner!" Soon more than a few thousands students gathered. On the day of the next imperial session, the students blocked Kong Guang's cart and delivered a petition to the palace. The emperor then reduced Bao Xuan's sentence from death penalty to exile, with Bao Xuan's head shaved and an iron hoop placed around his neck. Bao Xuan was exiled to Shangdang (上黨; roughly modern Zhangzi County) where he noticed fertile land and few bandits, a great place for agriculture. His family soon joined him in Shangdang.

The emperor Liu Xin's death in 1 BC resulted in the throne being passed to 8-year-old Liu Jizi (posthumously known as Emperor Ping), while power fell to the ruthless and ambitious regent Wang Mang. Wang Mang took drastic actions to consolidate power, including killing and exiling his political opponents (He Wu was one of them) on false charges. Still in exile, Bao Xuan and 5 other notable people vowed to never serve Wang Mang. News of their vow spread as they became targets of Wang Mang's wrath. Once, Bao Xuan's son-in-law Xu Gan (許紺) brought a friend Xin Xing (辛興) to visit Bao Xuan, and they had a meal together. Soon Bao Xuan was arrested and charged with abetting a criminal, as Xin Xing was allegedly a fugitive. Bao Xuan committed suicide in prison, but it's unknown whether it's by his own volition or being forced to.

Wang Mang overthrew the Han dynasty in 9 AD, and Bao Xuan's son Bao Yong (鮑永) joined the army to overthrow him in 17 AD. After the Han dynasty was restored, Bao Yong received important government posts.

== Notes and references ==
- Ban Gu. Han Shu (漢書) [Book of Han] (in Chinese).
- Fan Ye. Hou Han Shu (後漢書) [Book of Later Han] (in Chinese).
- Sima Guang (1086). Zizhi Tongjian (資治通鑑) [Comprehensive Mirror for Aid in Government] (in Chinese).
