= 64 BC Syria earthquake =

Historical earthquake that affected the region of Syria

- Epicenter: Syria (region of Antioch and Jerusalem)
- Areas affected: Antioch, Jerusalem, surrounding areas
- Casualties: 170,000 (per Justin); unspecified in other sources
- Citations: yes

The 64 BC Syria earthquake is mentioned in catalogues of historical earthquakes. It affected the region of Syria and may have caused structural damage in the city of Jerusalem.

== Sources ==
The earthquake is mentioned in an epitome of Liber Historiarum Philippicarum, written by the historian Justin (2nd century). Justin reported that a devastating earthquake affected Syria, dating the earthquake to the end of the reign of Tigranes the Great (reigned 95–55 BC) in Syria. The earthquake reportedly caused widespread destruction, and caused the deaths of 170,000 people.

There are disagreements over when Tigranes stopped reigning over Syria, and when the earthquake took place. Other suggested dates for the earthquake give the year as 65 BC or 69 BC. While Justin used the historian Gnaeus Pompeius Trogus as his main source, his surviving works indicate that Justin misunderstood this source, resulting in a confusion over the dates of events, and the identities of the characters mentioned.

Another mention of this earthquake is found in Historiarum Adversum Paganos, written by the historian Orosius (5th century). The narrative mentions that when the earthquake took place, Mithridates VI of Pontus was attending a festival of the goddess Ceres in the Bosporus. The text is thought to describe a visit of Mithridates to the Cimmerian Bosporus (modern Kerch Strait), located at the Sea of Azov and the peninsula of Crimea. The text does not clarify whether Mithridates himself experienced the earthquake, or merely heard news about it.

Chronographia by John Malalas briefly mentions the earthquake. He reports that it caused the Bouleuterion of Antioch to fall down. The destroyed building was eventually rebuilt by Pompey. Modern sources have extrapolated that Antioch suffered extensive structural damage or that the entire city was destroyed by the earthquake. However, Malalas states nothing about such an event.

== Possible Jewish sources ==
The same earthquake is supposed in modern sources to have affected Jerusalem, which is located 550 km (340 mi) south of Antioch. The earthquake supposedly caused structural damage to Jerusalem's city walls, and to the Second Temple's compound.

The primary source for such an event is the Babylonian Talmud. The narrative speaks of a struggle for power between the sons of Queen regnant Salome Alexandra (reigned 76-67 BC). Her two sons were Hyrcanus II and Aristobulus II, who were the last kings of the Hasmonean dynasty.

Hyrcanus II allied himself with the Nabataeans, and they helped him in a siege of Jerusalem. According to the Talmud, the two opposing sides reached an agreement to allow the supply of sacrificial animals to the Second Temple, which was needed for the year's celebration of the Passover. The defenders of the city would lower a "big basket" filled with golden coins over the city walls, which the attackers were required to fill. The attackers broke the agreement, and took the gold without fulfilling their end of the bargain. Instead of sending sacrificial animals, they send a pig. The pig struck its claws to the city walls, and suddenly an earthquake struck the Land of Israel. According to the Talmud, the earthquake shocked areas at a distance of 400 parasangs by 400 parasangs. The parasang is a Persian unit of distance, about 4000 yards long.

Josephus account of the siege mentions neither an earthquake, nor a pig. In his narrative, the Passover services were both prevented and mocked during the siege. Divine punishment struck in the form of a "storm of wind", that destroyed Judea's fruits. According to Josephus, prices rose due to the destruction. A modius of wheat cost 11 drachmae.

Cassius Dio also mentions the war between the two brothers, without mentioning an earthquake. The Talmud's earthquake may have originated in a story of figurative shock over the "ungodly breach of agreement", and the consequent disruption of services. This idea seems to be corroborated by the Jerusalem Talmud's narrative.

== Historical context ==
In chronological accounts, the 64 BC siege and the earthquake are in place after the death of Salome Alexandra (d. 67 BC), and before Pompey's Siege of Jerusalem (63 BC). Pompey's siege is known to have taken place shortly after the death of Mithridates VI of Pontus.

Pompey and Tigranes the Great were rivals in war until 66 BC, and then Pompey fought against the Kingdom of Pontus. Pompey's subordinate commander Marcus Aemilius Scaurus is credited with ending the Nabatean siege of Jerusalem. Scaurus was sent from Damascus to Judea, where he offered bribes to both sides of the conflict. The siege was lifted, and Scaurus offered his support to Aristobulus II.

The Passover associated with the siege and earthquake took place in 65 or 64 BC. In narratives of the earthquake, the Passover took place at the same time as a festival of Ceres. This would place the earthquake in springtime, as both these festivities traditionally took place in spring.

The "fanciful" Talmudic narrative reports on an earthquake, but does not support the idea that Jerusalem's city walls and the Second Temple suffered extensive damage. Josephus' narrative does not mention such a disaster either. Both Josephus and Strabo mention that Jerusalem's city walls were still robust during Pompey's siege, and that Pompey faced difficulties in capturing the city.

== Modern perspectives ==
A group of 8 sediment deformation horizons (mixed layers) have been identified among the Holocene sediments found in the Tze'elim Stream (Nahal Tze'elim) of the Dead Sea region. The deformations are believed to have a seismic event origin, with each deformation corresponding to a seismic event. The earliest sediment deformation in the group has been dated through radiometry to a range of dates between 200 BC and 40 BC. One theory associates the sentiment with the 64 BC earthquake.

In this view, the epicenter of the earthquake was in the Dead Sea. The earthquake would be strong enough to cause structural damage in both Jerusalem and Antioch. Doubts on this view point to the questionable historicity of the Talmudic sources, and the insufficient data from other primary sources.
