= 132 BC =

132 BC in various calendars
- Gregorian calendar: 132 BC; CXXXII BC
- Ab urbe condita: 622
- Ancient Egypt era: XXXIII dynasty, 192
- Pharaoh: Ptolemy VIII Physcon, 14
- Ancient Greek Olympiad (summer): 162nd Olympiad (victor)¹
- Assyrian calendar: 4619
- Balinese saka calendar: N/A
- Bengali calendar: −725 – −724
- Berber calendar: 819
- Buddhist calendar: 413
- Burmese calendar: −769
- Byzantine calendar: 5377–5378
- Chinese calendar: 戊申年 (Earth Monkey); 2566 or 2359 — to — 己酉年 (Earth Rooster); 2567 or 2360
- Coptic calendar: −415 – −414
- Discordian calendar: 1035
- Ethiopian calendar: −139 – −138
- Hebrew calendar: 3629–3630
- Hindu calendars
- Vikram Samvat: −75 – −74
- Shaka Samvat: N/A
- Kali Yuga: 2969–2970
- Holocene calendar: 9869
- Iranian calendar: 753 BP – 752 BP
- Islamic calendar: 776 BH – 775 BH
- Javanese calendar: N/A
- Julian calendar: N/A
- Korean calendar: 2202
- Minguo calendar: 2043 before ROC 民前2043年
- Nanakshahi calendar: −1599
- Seleucid era: 180/181 AG
- Thai solar calendar: 411–412
- Tibetan calendar: ས་ཕོ་སྤྲེ་ལོ་ (male Earth-Monkey) −5 or −386 or −1158 — to — ས་མོ་བྱ་ལོ་ (female Earth-Bird) −4 or −385 or −1157

Year 132 BC was a year of the pre-Julian Roman calendar. At the time it was known as the Year of the Consulship of Laenas and Rupilius (or, less frequently, year 622 Ab urbe condita) and the Third Year of Yuanguang. The denomination 132 BC for this year has been used since the early medieval period, when the Anno Domini calendar era became the prevalent method in Europe for naming years.

== Events ==
=== By place ===
==== Roman Republic ====
- The First Servile War ends when Publius Rupilius quelled the rebellion.

==== Mexico ====
- The Late Formative (or pre-Classic) period of the Maya civilization begins.

== Deaths ==
- Eunus, leader of the Slave Revolt (136–132 BC) in Sicily
- Publius Cornelius Scipio Nasica Serapio, Roman consul
