= 127 BC =

127 BC in various calendars
- Gregorian calendar: 127 BC; CXXVII BC
- Ab urbe condita: 627
- Ancient Egypt era: XXXIII dynasty, 197
- Pharaoh: Ptolemy VIII Physcon, 19
- Ancient Greek Olympiad (summer): 163rd Olympiad, year 2
- Assyrian calendar: 4624
- Balinese saka calendar: N/A
- Bengali calendar: −720 – −719
- Berber calendar: 824
- Buddhist calendar: 418
- Burmese calendar: −764
- Byzantine calendar: 5382–5383
- Chinese calendar: 癸丑年 (Water Ox); 2571 or 2364 — to — 甲寅年 (Wood Tiger); 2572 or 2365
- Coptic calendar: −410 – −409
- Discordian calendar: 1040
- Ethiopian calendar: −134 – −133
- Hebrew calendar: 3634–3635
- Hindu calendars
- Vikram Samvat: −70 – −69
- Shaka Samvat: N/A
- Kali Yuga: 2974–2975
- Holocene calendar: 9874
- Iranian calendar: 748 BP – 747 BP
- Islamic calendar: 771 BH – 770 BH
- Javanese calendar: N/A
- Julian calendar: N/A
- Korean calendar: 2207
- Minguo calendar: 2038 before ROC 民前2038年
- Nanakshahi calendar: −1594
- Seleucid era: 185/186 AG
- Thai solar calendar: 416–417
- Tibetan calendar: ཆུ་མོ་གླང་ལོ་ (female Water-Ox); 0 or −381 or −1153 — to — ཤིང་ཕོ་སྟག་ལོ་ (male Wood-Tiger); 1 or −380 or −1152

Year 127 BC was a year of the pre-Julian Roman calendar. At the time it was known as the Year of the Consulship of Ravilla and Cinna (or, less frequently, year 627 Ab urbe condita) and the Second Year of Yuanshuo. The denomination 127 BC for this year has been used since the early medieval period, when the Anno Domini calendar era became the prevalent method in Europe for naming years.

== Events ==
=== By place ===
==== Parthia ====
- The Scythians defeat the Parthians in a battle around Media.

==== China ====
- January: Emperor Wu of Han begins a policy of pressuring the client kings of the Han dynasty into dividing their kingdoms. Previously, only the eldest son would inherit a kingdom. However, in an edict, Wu permits the kings of Liang and Chengyang to divide the land of their states and distribute the land to their younger brothers. Wu grants these brothers titles and promises to do the same if other kings grant land to younger brothers and younger sons. This precedent pressures other kings to do likewise, and Wu places the younger brothers and younger sons under the jurisdiction of the imperial prefectures.
- Wei Qing defeats a Xiongnu army near Gaoque. He then invades the Ordos Plateau, defeats the Xiongnu and their Baiyang and Loufan allies in the battles of Puni and Fuli, and then defeats the main Xiongnu force. The conquered territory becomes Shuofang Commandery. Wu orders the foundation of Shuofang City, and the system of defenses that had been built by the Qin dynasty general Meng Tian are repaired.
- The Han rationalize the northern frontier, abandoning the remote region of Zaoyang to the Xiongnu.

== Deaths ==
- Nicomedes II (Epiphanes), king of Bithynia
- Zhufu Yan, Chinese politician and official of the Han dynasty (or 126 BC)
