= 47 BC =

47 BC in various calendars
- Gregorian calendar: 47 BC; XLVII BC
- Ab urbe condita: 707
- Ancient Egypt era: XXXIII dynasty, 277
- Pharaoh: Cleopatra VII, 5
- Ancient Greek Olympiad (summer): 183rd Olympiad, year 2
- Assyrian calendar: 4704
- Balinese saka calendar: N/A
- Bengali calendar: −640 – −639
- Berber calendar: 904
- Buddhist calendar: 498
- Burmese calendar: −684
- Byzantine calendar: 5462–5463
- Chinese calendar: 癸酉年 (Water Rooster); 2651 or 2444 — to — 甲戌年 (Wood Dog); 2652 or 2445
- Coptic calendar: −330 – −329
- Discordian calendar: 1120
- Ethiopian calendar: −54 – −53
- Hebrew calendar: 3714–3715
- Hindu calendars
- Vikram Samvat: 10–11
- Shaka Samvat: N/A
- Kali Yuga: 3054–3055
- Holocene calendar: 9954
- Iranian calendar: 668 BP – 667 BP
- Islamic calendar: 689 BH – 688 BH
- Javanese calendar: N/A
- Julian calendar: N/A
- Korean calendar: 2287
- Minguo calendar: 1958 before ROC 民前1958年
- Nanakshahi calendar: −1514
- Seleucid era: 265/266 AG
- Thai solar calendar: 496–497
- Tibetan calendar: ཆུ་མོ་བྱ་ལོ་ (female Water-Bird); 80 or −301 or −1073 — to — ཤིང་ཕོ་ཁྱི་ལོ་ (male Wood-Dog); 81 or −300 or −1072

Year 47 BC was a year of the pre-Julian Roman calendar. At the time, it was known as the Year of the Consulship of Calenus and Vatinius (or, less frequently, year 707 Ab urbe condita). The denomination 47 BC for this year has been used since the early medieval period, when the Anno Domini calendar era became the prevalent method in Europe for naming years.

== Events ==
=== By place ===
==== Roman Republic ====
- Consuls: Quintus Fufius Calenus, Publius Vatinius.
- Julius Caesar returns to Rome and is dictator for a year.
- Civil War:
  - August – Julius Caesar leads victory against Pharnaces II of Pontus and at the Battle of Zela.
  - August – Julius Caesar quells a mutiny of his veterans in Rome.
  - October – Caesar's invasion of Africa, against Metellus Scipio and Labienus, Caesar's former lieutenant in Gaul.

==== Egypt ====
- January 13 – Queen Cleopatra VII promotes her younger brother Ptolemy XIV of Egypt to co-ruler.
- February – Caesar and his ally Cleopatra VII of Egypt defeat the forces of the rival Egyptian Queen Arsinoe IV in the Battle of the Nile. Ptolemy is killed; Caesar, with the aid of Mithridates I of the Bosporus, then relieves his besieged forces in Alexandria.

==== Anatolia ====
- August 2 – Caesar defeats Pharnaces II of Pontus, king of the Bosphorus, in the Battle of Zela (the war Caesar tersely describes as veni, vidi, vici).

==== Judea ====
- Battle at Mount Tabor in Judea: Roman troops, commanded by Gabinius, defeat the forces of Alexander, son of Aristobulus II of Judea, who is attempting to re-establish Judean independence. Some 10,000 Jews die at the hands of the Romans.

==== China ====
- Feng Yuan becomes consort to Emperor Yuan of the Han Dynasty.

== Births ==
- June 23 – Caesarion, prince of Egypt, later Ptolemy XV (d. 30 BC)
- Marcus Antonius Antyllus, son of Mark Antony and Fulvia (d. 30 BC)

== Deaths ==
- Pharnaces II of Pontus, king of the Bosporan Kingdom (b. c. 97 BC)
- Ptolemy XIII Theos Philopator, king of Egypt (drowned in the Nile)
- Alexander, Hasmonean prince (executed)
