= Ptolemy Philadelphus (son of Cleopatra) =

King of Syria from 34 to 30 BC

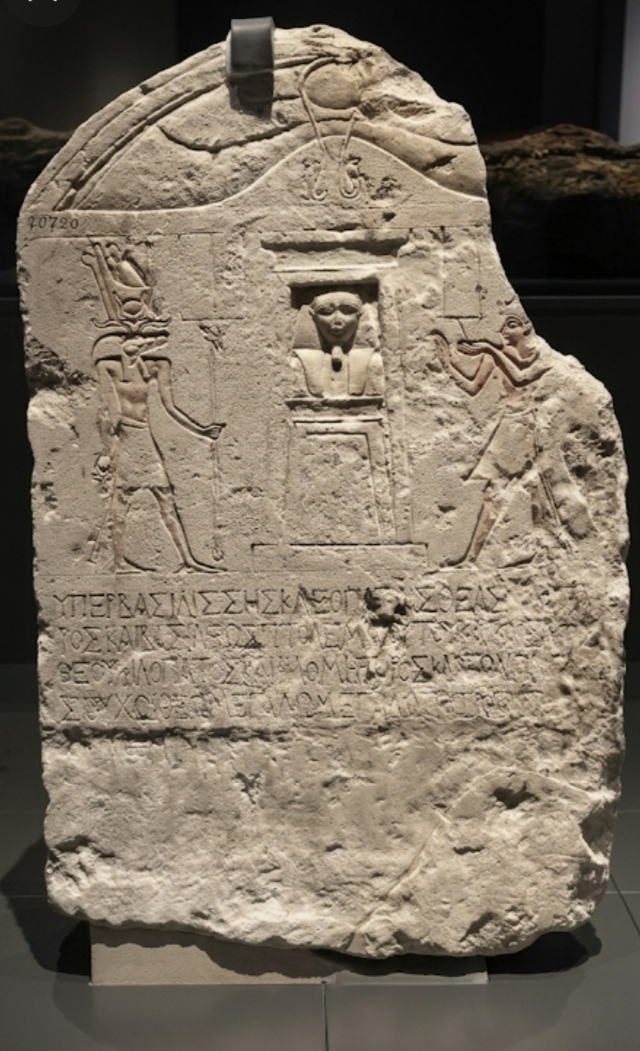
- Ptolemy making an offering to a bust of Julius Caesar, while dressed in Pharaoh's regalia. Now in Grand Egyptian Museum.

King of Syria
- Reign: 34–30 BC
- Coronation: 34 BC at the Donations of Alexandria
- Born: August/September 36 BC; Antioch, Syria (modern-day Antakya, Hatay, Turkey)
- Died: 29 BC (speculation)
- Dynasty: Ptolemaic
- Father: Mark Antony
- Mother: Cleopatra VII Philopator

Ptolemy Philadelphus (Greek: Πτολεμαῖος ὁ Φιλάδελφος, Ptolemaios Philadelphos, "Ptolemy the brother-loving", August/September 36 BC – 29 BC) was a Ptolemaic prince and was the youngest and fourth child of Greek Ptolemaic Queen Cleopatra VII of Egypt, and her third with Roman Triumvir Mark Antony.

== Biography ==
=== Early life and reign ===
Ptolemy Philadelphus was of Greek and Roman heritage. His father Mark Antony summoned Cleopatra to a summit near Antioch, Syria (now a part of modern Turkey) in a place Plutarch locates as being situated between Beirut and Sidon, called Light, an unwalled village. If Plutarch is to be believed, Ptolemy Philadelphus was conceived during this meeting between roughly November and December 37 BC. William Woodthorpe Tarn believed his birth (presumably in Alexandria, Egypt) was between August–September 36 BC.

Ptolemy Philadelphus was named after the original Ptolemy II Philadelphus (the second Pharaoh of the Ptolemaic dynasty) and Cleopatra's intention was recreating the former Ptolemaic Kingdom, which she herself received from Antony in the Donations of Antioch in 36 BC at this time with full approval from Octavian. Two years later in late 34 BC, at the Donations of Alexandria, part of her kingdom was granted to Ptolemy Philadelphus making him ruler of Syria, Phoenicia and Cilicia.

Having approved of Antony's planned reorganization of the East in 36 BC, by 34 BC, their political situations had evolved and Octavian then used with potency the Donations of Alexandria in his propaganda war against Antony. Ultimately, the parents of Ptolemy Philadelphus were defeated by Caesar Octavian (future Emperor Augustus) during the naval battle at Actium, Greece in 31 BC. The next year, his parents committed suicide as Octavian's legions invaded Egypt.

=== Capture and fate ===
Octavian took him and his elder siblings Alexander Helios and Cleopatra Selene II from Egypt to Roman Italy (Italia). Octavian celebrated his military triumph by parading the three orphans in heavy golden chains in the streets of Rome. The chains were so heavy that they could not walk, prompting reactions of sympathy from the Romans. Octavian gave these siblings to Octavia Minor, his second-eldest sister who was their father's former wife.

The fate of Ptolemy Philadelphus is unknown. Plutarch states that the only child that Octavian killed out of Antony's children was Marcus Antonius Antyllus, but the ancient sources make no mention of him after being taken to Rome with his surviving siblings. His sister Cleopatra Selene survived to adulthood and was married to Juba of Mauretania, a client king of the Roman empire. Through her, the Ptolemaic line intermarried back into the Roman nobility for many generations. The only further mention of Alexander Helios and Ptolemy Philadelphus comes from Cassius Dio, who states that when their sister, Cleopatra Selene II, married King Juba II [25 BC], Octavian (by then named Augustus) spared the lives of Alexander Helios and Ptolemy Philadelphus as a favor to the couple. If Ptolemy Philadelphus survived to adulthood, proof of his survival has not been found. Roller speculates that he may have died from illness in the winter of 29 BC.

== See also ==
- List of people who disappeared mysteriously (pre-1910)
- List of Syrian monarchs
- Timeline of Syrian history
- Philoteria, city on the Sea of Galilee founded by Ptolemy II

== Sources ==
- Plutarch's Antony
- "Ptolemy Philadelphus". Archived from the original on 2006-08-28.
- Cleopatra Selene II and Juba II
