= 10s =

Second decade of the first century AD

Bust of Roman emperor Tiberius (r. 14–37), who reigned for most of the decade.

The 10s decade ran from January 1, AD 10, to December 31, AD 19.

In Europe, the decade saw the end of the Early Imperial campaigns in Germania when Roman forces led by Germanicus defeated Germanic tribes in the Battle of Idistaviso in AD 16. In the subsequent year, a war broke out between Maroboduus and Arminius. In Africa, Tacfarinas led his own Musulamii tribe and a loose and changing coalition of other Berber tribes in a war against the Romans in North Africa during the rule of the emperor Tiberius (AD 14–37). The Armenian Artaxiad dynasty was overthrown by the Romans. In China, the Red Eyebrows Rebellion erupted against Wang Mang, emperor of the Xin dynasty. In Korea, Daeso, the ruler of the kingdom of Dongbuyeo, led his armies into Goguryeo once again. This time, Muhyul, a prince of Goguryeo, led the armies of Goguryeo in a well-planned ambush and slaughtered all of Daeso's army. Only he and a few of his men escaped home.

Literary works from the 10s include works from the ancient Roman poet Ovid, Tristia and Epistulae ex Ponto, while Nicolaus of Damascus wrote a biography of Emperor Augustus (Bios Kaisaros).

In the Roman Empire, an edict was issued effecting an empire-wide ban on divinatory practices especially astrology. The edict requires any consultation between a customer and a practitioner to be conducted with at least one third party witness present and bans inquiry into anyone's death. A large earthquake caused the destruction of at least twelve cities in the region of Lydia in the Roman province of Asia in Asia Minor. In China, a major flooding took place in the Yellow River in AD 11, which is credited with helping bring about the fall of the Xin dynasty in the next decade.

Manning (2008) tentatively estimates the world population in AD 10 as 241 million.

== Demographics ==
Due to lack of reliable demographic data, estimates of the world population in the 1st century vary wildly, with estimates for AD 1 varying from 150 to 300 million. Demographers typically do not attempt to estimate most specific years in antiquity, instead giving approximate numbers for round years such as AD 1 or AD 200. However, attempts at reconstructing the world population in more specific years have been made, with Manning (2008) tentatively estimating the world population in AD 10 as 241 million.

== Events ==
=== 10 AD ===
==== Roman Empire ====
- Differentiation of localized Teutonic tribes of the Irminones.
- Senatus consultum Silanianum is adopted.
- Ovid completes Tristia III (the "Sorrows") describing the sadness of banishment.

==== Central Asia ====
- The Euthydemid dynasty, a Greek dynasty in Bactria, is brought to an end.

==== China ====
- The usurper Wang Mang (who rules during a brief interregnum known as the Xin dynasty) outlaws the private purchase and use of crossbows. Despite this, Liu Xiu, the later Emperor Guangwu of Han, buys crossbows in the winter of AD 22 to aid the rebellion of his brother Liu Yan (styled Bosheng) and Li Tong.

=== 11 AD ===
==== Roman Empire ====
- Germania Inferior and the Rhine are secured by Germanicus.
- Emperor Augustus abandons his plan to create a defensive border at the Elbe, in order to reinforce the Roman defenses along the Rhine and the Danube.
- An edict is issued effecting an empire-wide ban on divinatory practices, especially astrology. The edict requires any consultation between a customer and a practitioner to be conducted with at least one third party witness present, and bans inquiry into anyone's death.

==== Persia ====
- Artabanus II becomes ruler of Parthia.

==== India ====
- Satakarni begins his reign as Emperor of the Andhra Empire (AD 11–29).

==== China ====
- The Yellow River experiences a major flood. This flood is credited for the downfall of the short-lived Xin dynasty.

=== 12 AD ===
==== Roman Empire ====
- Augustus orders a major invasion of Germany beyond the Rhine.
- Quirinius returns from Judea to become a counselor to Tiberius.
- The Armenian Artaxiad dynasty is overthrown by the Romans.
- Ovid stops writing Fasti, because of the lack of resources (being far from the libraries of Rome). He completes 6 books that detail festivals found in the Roman calendar.

==== Palestine ====
- Annius Rufus is appointed Prefect of Judea.

=== 13 AD ===
==== Roman Empire ====
- Emperor Augustus initiates his third census of the Roman Empire after 20 years.
- Abgarus of Edessa is reinstalled as king of Osroene.
- The Senate passes a senatus consultum restricting the reduced Vigintisexviri to the Ordo Equester.
- Ovid publishes books 1-3 of his Epistulae ex Ponto.

==== Greece ====
- Strabo publishes his book on the shape of the Earth.

==== China ====
- Last year (3rd) of Shijianguo era of the Chinese Xin Dynasty (considered the lucky number of those from the Chinese Xin Dynasty).

=== 14 AD ===
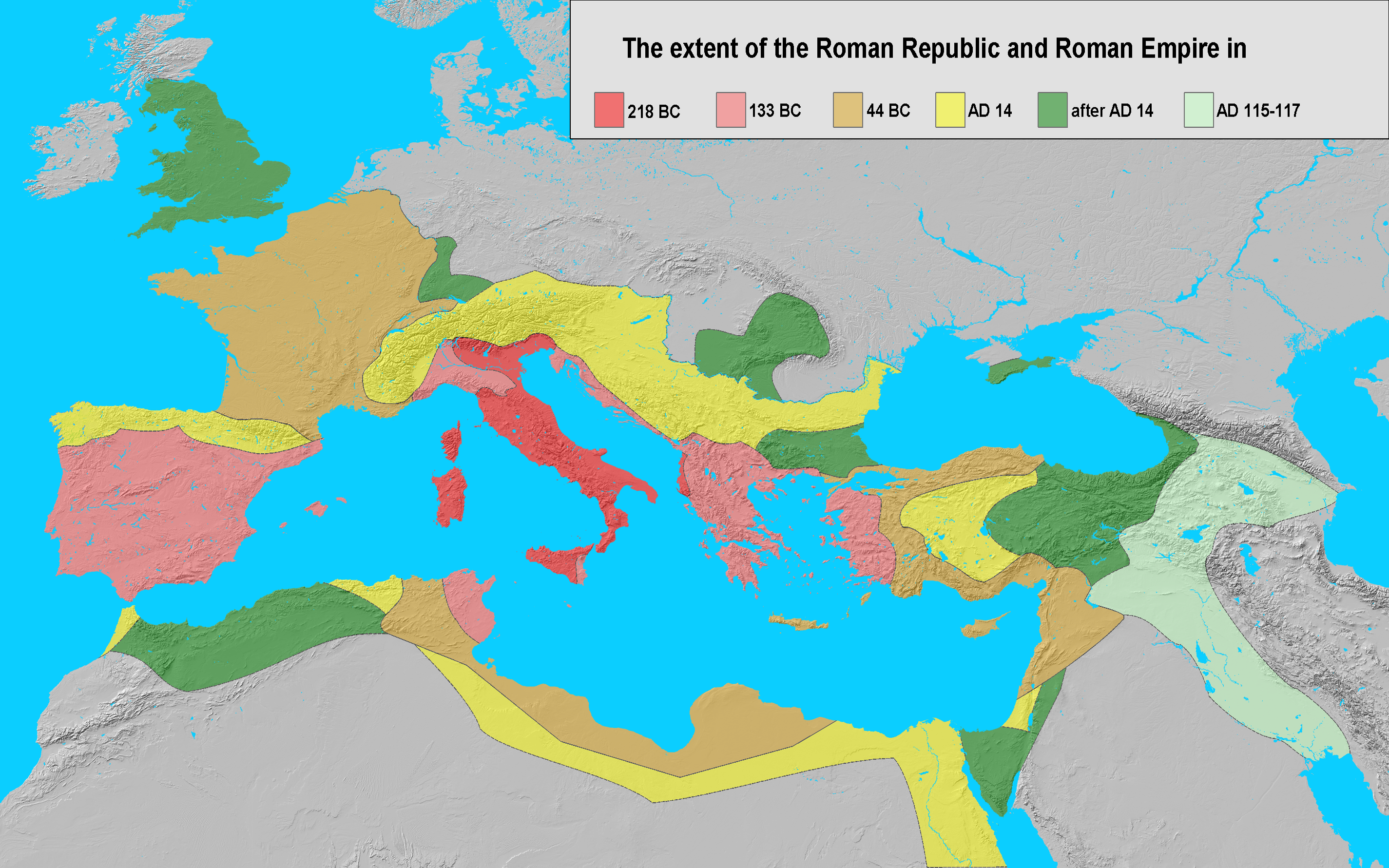
The Roman Empire in 14 AD (all colors except dark and light green)

==== Roman Empire ====
- Augustus' third (and final) 20-year census of the Roman Empire reports a total of 4,973,000 citizens.
- August 19 – Augustus, the first Roman emperor, dies and is declared to be a god.
- September 18 – Tiberius succeeds his stepfather Augustus as Roman emperor.
- Legions on the Rhine mutiny after the death of Augustus; Germanicus restores discipline amongst the legions.
- Germanicus is appointed commander of the forces in Germany, beginning a campaign that will end in 16.
- Germanicus leads a brutal raid against the Marsi, a German tribe on the upper Ruhr river, who are massacred.
- The town and port of Nauportus are plundered by a mutinous Roman legion that was sent there to build roads and bridges.
- Sextus Appuleius and Sextus Pompeius serve as Roman consuls.

==== China ====
- First year of tianfeng era of the Chinese Xin Dynasty.
- Famine hits China; some citizens turn to cannibalism.

=== 15 AD ===
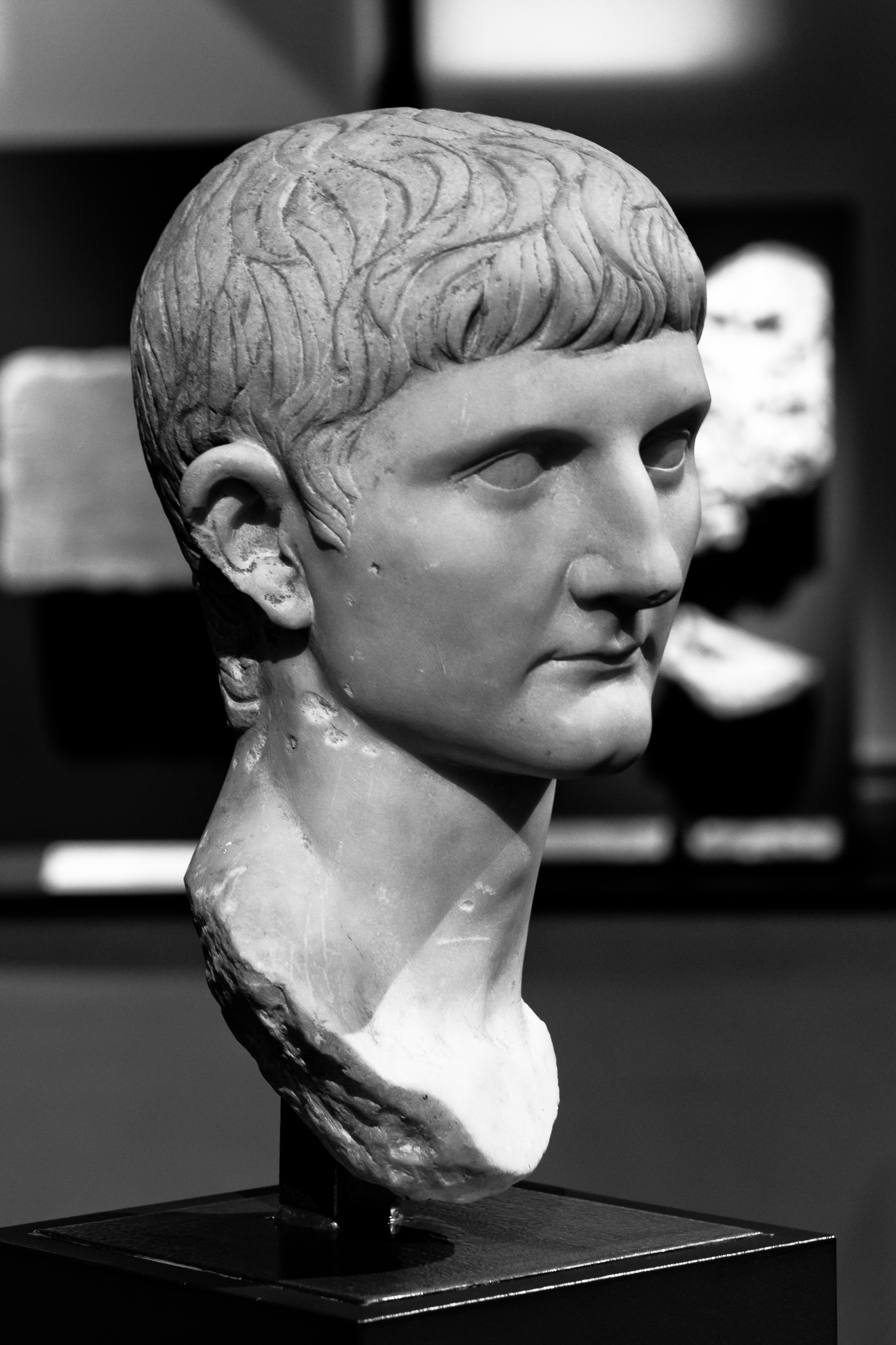
Bust of Germanicus (15 BC – AD 19)

==== Roman Empire ====
- Early (approx.) – Emona (on the site of modern-day Ljubljana) is founded by Legio XV Apollinaris.
- May – As part of his campaign against the Germanic peoples, Germanicus captures Thusnelda, wife of Arminius.
- Summer – Germanicus launches a two-pronged attack from Vetera and Moguntiacum. On his return journey, he recaptures the aquila of Legio XIX and visits the battlefield of the Teutoburg Forest. Germanicus arranges the burial for the remains of Varus' army.
- Varna (Odessus), on the Bulgarian Black Sea Coast, is annexed to the Roman province of Moesia.
- In Rome, the election of magistrates passes from the people to the Emperor and the Senate.
- The river Tiber floods parts of Rome.
- Nicolaus of Damascus writes a biography of the Emperor Augustus (Bios Kaisaros).

=== 16 AD ===
==== Roman Empire ====
- A Roman army of 50,000 men commanded by Germanicus gains a great victory at Idistaviso, defeating the German war chief Arminius, and recovering the lost eagles of Varus' legions.
- Germanicus employs the North Sea fleet to avoid dangerous rivers, embarking an army in the Rhine Delta, aboard circa 1,000 ships. He defeats the Germans at the Amisius river estuary and the Weser, but during its return, the Roman fleet is partially destroyed by storms.
- Vonones, the beleaguered king of Armenia, is summoned to Syria, by Roman governor Creticus Silanus.
- Ovid's "Epistulae ex Ponto" appears.

=== 17 AD ===
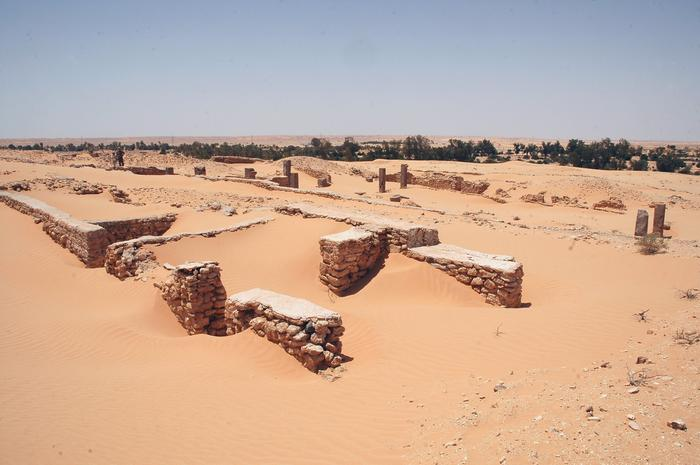
Ruins of the Limes Tripolitanus (Africa)

==== Roman Empire ====
- May 26 – Germanicus returns to Rome as a conquering hero; he celebrates a triumph for his victories over the Cherusci, Chatti and other Germanic tribes west of the Elbe.
- Emperor Tiberius sends Germanicus to the east, in order to lead a military campaign against Parthia.
- Cappadocia (Asia Minor) becomes a Roman province.
- Lucius Aelius Sejanus becomes Praetorian prefect.

==== Africa ====
- Tacfarinas, Numidian deserter from the Roman army, begins a guerrilla war against the Romans. He leads his own Musulamii tribe and a coalition of Berbers, attacking the Limes Tripolitanus, a fortified zone (limes) of the Roman Empire in Africa.

==== Palestine ====
- Herod Antipas, son of Herod the Great, builds the city Tiberias on the western shore of the Sea of Galilee, in honor of Tiberius.

==== Asia Minor ====
- An earthquake in Anatolia destroys the city of Sardis and damages several other cities.

=== 18 AD ===
==== Roman Empire ====
- A vexillatio (sub-unit or detachment) of Legio III Augusta is destroyed by an ambush in Africa.

==== Syria ====
- Winter – Germanicus Caesar arrives in Syria, as new commander-in-chief for the Roman East.
- Gnaeus Calpurnius Piso, governor of Syria, ignores the order of Germanicus to send Syrian-based legions, including Legio VI Ferrata and Legio X Fretensis, to Armenia to back him in his planned coronation of Artaxias III.

==== Parthia ====
- Germanicus concludes a peace treaty with Artabanus II of Parthia, in which he is recognized as king and friend of Rome.

==== China ====
- After a flooding of the Yellow River in China, farmers are forced to rebel. Emperor Wang Mang reacts by sending an army (some 100,000 men) against the agrarian rebels. The rebel leaders, concerned that during battle it will become impossible to tell friend from foe, order that their men color their eyebrows red – and this is where the name Chimei ("The Red Eyebrows") comes from.

==== Korea ====
- Daemusin becomes ruler of the Korean kingdom of Goguryeo.

==== India ====
- In India, the Indo-Parthians control Taxila.

=== 19 AD ===
==== Roman Empire ====
- Maroboduus, king of the Marcomanni, is deposed by Catualda. This ends the threat to the Romans from Germanic tribes until the reign of Marcus Aurelius. Rome places them under its protection.
- Germanicus Julius Caesar, commander in chief of the Roman legions in the East and beloved by the legionaries, falls ill and dies. On his deathbed he accuses Gnaeus Calpurnius Piso, the governor of Syria, of poisoning him.
- Emperor Tiberius expels the Egyptians from Rome, and deports 4,000 Jews from Sicily.
- Agrippina the Elder accuses Gnaeus Calpurnius Piso of having assassinated her husband Germanicus Julius Caesar in Antioch. However, there is no credible evidence and the charge is never proven. (In ancient times, when medical science was not advanced, poison was usually suspected whenever a young, healthy person died suddenly. There was no way to pinpoint and trace the substance after death; therefore, it was considered a quick, easy and non-traceable form of homicide.)
- A triumphal arch is built for Germanicus Julius Caesar in Saintes.

==== Parthia ====
- King Vonones I is removed to Cilicia and kept under house arrest. He escapes, but is caught and killed by a retired Roman legion veteran.

==== Asia ====
- Last year (6th) of Tianfeng era of the Chinese Xin Dynasty.
- First flying machine, according to the Hanshu.
- Gondophares becomes king of the Saces.

== Births ==
=== 10 AD ===
- Hero of Alexandria, Greek engineer (d. c. AD 70)
- Pope Linus, Pope in Catholic church (d. AD 76)
- Liu Penzi, Chinese puppet emperor (d. after AD 27)
- Lucius Vipstanus Poplicola, Roman consul (d. after AD 59)
- Tigellinus, Roman Praetorian prefect (d. AD 69)

=== 12 AD ===
- Mark the Evangelist, Christian evangelist, martyr, known for The Gospel of Mark (approximate date) (d. 68 AD)
- August 31 – Caligula, Roman emperor (d. 41 AD)

=== 13 AD ===
- Casperius Aelianus, Roman praetorian prefect (d. AD 98)
- Gaius Silius, Roman politician (d. AD 48)

=== 14 AD ===
- Lucius Caecilius Iucundus, Roman banker (d. AD 62)
- Marcus Junius Silanus, Roman consul (d. AD 54)

=== 15 AD ===
- September 24 – Vitellius, Roman emperor (d. AD 69)
- November 6 – Agrippina the Younger, Roman empress (d. AD 59)
- Apollonius of Tyana, Greek philosopher (d. c. AD 97)
- Ennia Thrasylla, Roman noblewoman (d. AD 38)
- Lollia Paulina, Roman empress (d. AD 49)
- Lucius Verginius Rufus, Roman consul (d. AD 97)

=== 16 AD ===
- September 16 – Julia Drusilla, daughter of Germanicus and Agrippina the Elder (d. AD 38)
- Claudius Drusus, son of Claudius and Plautia Urgulanilla (approximate date)
- Decimus Junius Silanus Torquatus, Roman consul (d. AD 64)

=== 18 AD ===
- Julia Livilla, daughter of Germanicus and Agrippina the Elder (approximate date) (d. AD 41)

=== 19 AD ===
- October 10 – Tiberius Gemellus, grandson of Tiberius (d. c. 38 AD)

== Deaths ==
=== 10 AD ===
- Didymus Chalcenterus, Greek scholar and grammarian (b. c. 63 BC)
- Hillel the Elder, Babylonian sage, scholar, and Jewish leader (b. c. 110 BC)

=== 11 AD ===
- Marcus Antistius Labeo, prominent Roman jurist

=== 12 AD ===
- Rhoemetalces I – king of the Odrysian kingdom of Thrace from 12 BC to 12 AD

=== 13 AD ===
- Quintus Pedius, Roman (deaf) painter (approximate date)
- Wang Zhengjun, Chinese empress (b. 71 BC)

=== 14 AD ===
- August 19 – Augustus, Roman emperor (b. 63 BC)
- August 20 – Agrippa Postumus, grandson of Augustus and former heir to the Empire (b. 12 BC)
- Gnaeus Pompeius (Rufus), Roman consul
- Julia the Elder, daughter of Augustus (b. 39 BC)
- Lucius Aemilius Paullus, Roman consul
- Parthenius of Nicaea, Greek grammarian
- Paullus Fabius Maximus, Roman consul
- Sempronius Gracchus, Roman nobleman

=== 15 AD ===
- Lucius Seius Strabo, Roman praetorian prefect (b. 46 BC)

=== 16 AD ===
- September 13 – Marcus Scribonius Libo, Roman senator (forced to commit suicide)
- Clemens, Roman slave and impostor (executed by Tiberius)
- Scribonia, second wife of Caesar Augustus (approximate date)

=== 17 AD ===
- Antiochus III, King of Commagene
- Archelaus, king of Cappadocia
- Gaius Julius Hyginus, Roman Latin writer
- Livy, Roman historian
- Lucius Vipstanus Gallus, Roman senator
- Ovid, Roman poet (or AD 18)

=== 18 AD ===
- Crinagoras, Greek epigrammatist (b. 70 BC)
- Herod Archelaus, Jewish ruler (ethnarch) (b. 23 BC)
- Mother Lü, rebel leader against the Xin dynasty
- Publius Ovidius Naso, Roman poet (or AD 17)
- Yang Xiong, Chinese philosopher (b. 53 BC)
- Yuri, Korean ruler of Goguryeo

=== 19 AD ===
- October 10 – Germanicus, Roman general (b. 15 BC)
- Cotys III (or Cotys VIII), Roman client king of Thrace
- Vonones I, king of the Parthian Empire

== Significant people ==
- Caesar Augustus, Roman Emperor (27 BC–AD 14)
- Tiberius, Roman Emperor (AD 14–37)
- Germanicus, Roman General
