= 40 BC =

40 BC in various calendars
- Gregorian calendar: 40 BC; XL BC
- Ab urbe condita: 714
- Ancient Egypt era: XXXIII dynasty, 284
- Pharaoh: Cleopatra VII, 12
- Ancient Greek Olympiad (summer): 185th Olympiad (victor)¹
- Assyrian calendar: 4711
- Balinese saka calendar: N/A
- Bengali calendar: −633 – −632
- Berber calendar: 911
- Buddhist calendar: 505
- Burmese calendar: −677
- Byzantine calendar: 5469–5470
- Chinese calendar: 庚辰年 (Metal Dragon); 2658 or 2451 — to — 辛巳年 (Metal Snake); 2659 or 2452
- Coptic calendar: −323 – −322
- Discordian calendar: 1127
- Ethiopian calendar: −47 – −46
- Hebrew calendar: 3721–3722
- Hindu calendars
- Vikram Samvat: 17–18
- Shaka Samvat: N/A
- Kali Yuga: 3061–3062
- Holocene calendar: 9961
- Iranian calendar: 661 BP – 660 BP
- Islamic calendar: 681 BH – 680 BH
- Javanese calendar: N/A
- Julian calendar: 40 BC; XL BC
- Korean calendar: 2294
- Minguo calendar: 1951 before ROC 民前1951年
- Nanakshahi calendar: −1507
- Seleucid era: 272/273 AG
- Thai solar calendar: 503–504
- Tibetan calendar: ལྕགས་ཕོ་འབྲུག་ལོ་ (male Iron-Dragon); 87 or −294 or −1066 — to — ལྕགས་མོ་སྦྲུལ་ལོ་ (female Iron-Snake); 88 or −293 or −1065

Year 40 BC was either a common year starting on Thursday, Friday or Saturday or a leap year starting on Thursday or Friday of the Julian calendar (the sources differ, see leap year error for further information) and a common year starting on Friday of the Proleptic Julian calendar. At the time, it was known as the Year of the Consulship of Calvinus and Pollio (or, less frequently, year 714 Ab urbe condita). The denomination 40 BC for this year has been used since the early medieval period, when the Anno Domini calendar era became the prevalent method in Europe for naming years.

== Events ==
=== By place ===
==== Roman Republic ====
- Consuls: Gnaeus Domitius Calvinus and Gaius Asinius Pollio.
- Siege of Perusia: trying a last attempt to break the siege, which fails; Lucius Antonius surrenders to Octavian. His life is spared, but the citizens are executed or sold into slavery. Fulvia flees with her children and is exiled to Sicyon, where she dies of a sudden illness.
- Spring – Quintus Salvidienus Rufus marches to Transalpine Gaul to take command of the eleven legions, after the death of Quintus Fufius Calenus. Octavian divorces Claudia and marries Scribonia, a sister of Lucius Scribonius Libo and a follower of Sextus.
- May – Gaius Claudius Marcellus, a distinguished member of the Claudii, dies. He leaves Octavia the Younger (the elder sister of Octavian) widowed. She will later marry Mark Antony.
- Sextus Pompey dispatches Menas with four legions and captures Sardinia, driving out Octavian's governor Marcus Lurius. He seizes the capital, Caralis and occupies Corsica. Sextus besieges Cosenza in Bruttium and Thurii in Lucania, ravaging the territory with his cavalry.
- Sextus' fleet raids the ports of Puteoli and Ostia. The populace hold the Triumvirs responsible for prolonging the war, provoking a riot on the Forum. Octavian, with the Praetorian Guard, goes to intercept the riot, and only escapes with his life because Antony summons troops to rescue his junior colleague.
- Treaty of Brundisium: The Triumvirs agrees to divide the Roman Republic into spheres of influence. Gaius Octavian styles himself "Imperator Caesar" and takes control of the Western provinces. Mark Antony is given the Eastern provinces; the River Drin, the boundary between the provinces Illyricum and Macedonia, is to serve as their frontier. Marcus Aemilius Lepidus controls Hispania and Africa. The treaty is cemented by the marriage of Antony and Octavia the Younger.

=== Asia minor ===
- Quintus Labienus occupies Cilicia and marches, with an army, into Anatolia. Most cities surrender without resistance, except for Alabanda and Mylasa. The Parthians restore their territory to nearly the limits of the old Achaemenid Empire. Labienus proclaims himself "Parthian Emperor" of Asia Minor.

==== Egypt ====
- Mark Antony leaves Alexandria. After receiving news of the outcome at Perusia while en route to Phoenicia, he sets sail for Italy meeting the ambassadors of Sextus Pompey in Athens.

==== Igodomigodo Kingdom ====
- Ogiso Igodo dissolves the Ik’edionwere Council (western Africa). establishes the Royal Council with members of the disbanded Ik’edionwere Council and the Odibo-Ogiso group. He names his combined territories, Igodomigodo with its capital at Ugbekun.

==== Greece ====
- Athenodorus, a philosopher, encounters a ghost in Athens. This popular story is one of the first poltergeist stories in history.

==== Parthia ====
- Pacorus crosses, with the help of Quintus Labienus, the Euphrates and invades Syria. The capital Antioch surrenders, and the Parthians take Phoenicia and Judea. However, they cannot besiege the fortified city of Tyre, because they have no fleet.
- Parthians conquer Jerusalem. Hyrcanus II is removed from power, while Antigonus the Hasmonean becomes king of Judea under Parthian rule. Herod the Great flees Jerusalem to Rome. There he is titled king of Judea by Mark Antony.

==== China ====
- The Ji Jiu Pian dictionary, published about this year during the Han dynasty, is the earliest known reference to the hydraulic-powered trip hammer device.

== Births ==
- Ariobarzanes II, Roman client king of Armenia (d. 4 AD)
- Cleopatra Selene (d. AD 6) and Alexander Helios (d. between 29 and 25 BC), twins of Cleopatra VII and Mark Antony

== Deaths ==
- Fulvia, wife of Publius Clodius Pulcher and Mark Antony (b. 77 BC)
- Gaius Claudius Marcellus, Roman consul (b. 88 BC)
- Lucius Decidius Saxa, Roman general and governor
- Phasael, prince of the Herodian dynasty of Judea
- Quintus Fufius Calenus, Roman general and consul
- Quintus Salvidienus Rufus, Roman general and advisor
- Simeon ben Shetach, Pharisee scholar and prince (Nasi)
- Tigellius, Sardinian lyric poet (close friend of Julius Caesar)
