= 220s =

Decade

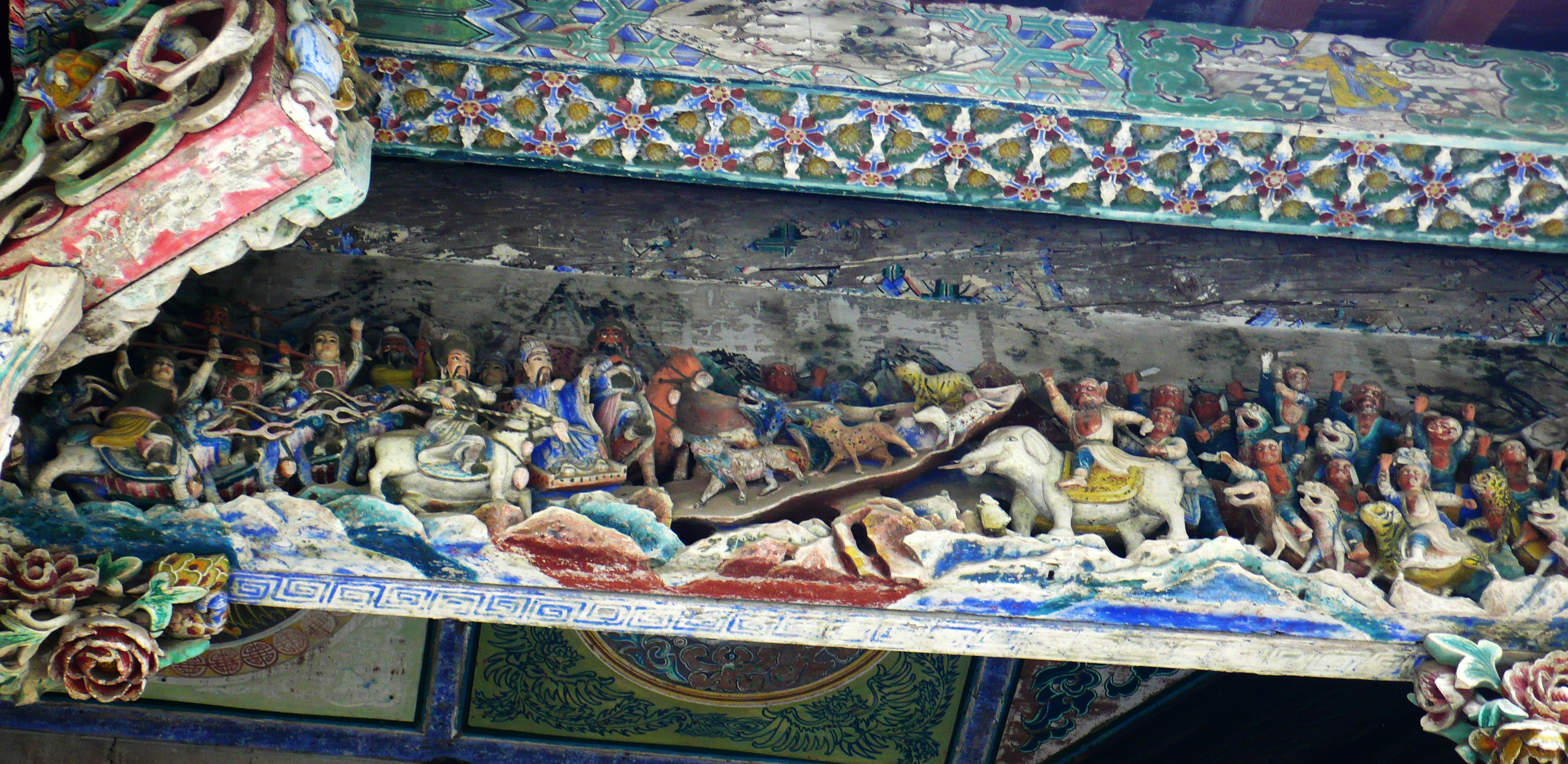
A wooden diorama of Zhuge Liang's Southern Campaign, which took place in 225.

The 220s decade ran from January 1, 220, to December 31, 229.

== Events ==
=== 220 ===
==== By place ====
====== Roman Empire ======
- The Goths invade Asia Minor and the Balkans.
- An Indian delegation visits the Roman emperor Elagabalus.
- Great frost in Roman Britain is said to have lasted for five months.
- Imperator Marcus Aurelius Antoninus Augustus (Elagabalus) and Publius Valerius Comazon become Roman consuls.
- Elagabalus divorces Julia Paula and marries Aquilia Severa, a Vestal Virgin. The wedding causes an enormous controversy – traditionally, the punishment for breaking celibacy is death by being buried alive.

====== Parthian Empire ======
- King Ardashir I, founder of the Sassanid dynasty, gains support from some Parthian sub-kings and revolts against the rule of Vologases VI. Ardashir, a grandson of Sasan, had ruled Persis since 208 and six years earlier gained control of the region surrounding Persepolis.

====== China ======
- March 15 – Cao Cao, Imperial Chancellor and ruler of the Kingdom of Wei, dies.
- December 11 – Cao Pi receives the abdication of Emperor Xian of Han and proclaims himself emperor of Cao Wei. This ends the Han dynasty, the former emperor being created Duke of Shanyang.

==== By topic ====
====== Religion ======
- The Wei dynasty gives official recognition to Taoism as its religious sect, and the sect's celestial masters reciprocate, by giving spiritual approbation to the Wei as successors to the Han. By the end of the century, most powerful families in northern China have subscribed to Daoist principles.

=== 221 ===
==== By place ====
====== Roman Empire ======
- June 26 – Emperor Elagabalus adopts his cousin Alexander Severus as his heir, and receives the title of Caesar.
- July – Elagabalus is forced to divorce Aquilia Severa, and marries his third wife Annia Faustina. After five months he returns to Severa, and claims that the original divorce is invalid. The marriage is symbolic, because Elagabalus appears to be homosexual or bisexual. According to the historian Cassius Dio, he has a stable relationship with his chariot driver, the slave Hierocles.

====== Asia ======
- May 15 – Liu Bei, Chinese warlord and descendant of the imperial clan of the Han dynasty, proclaims himself emperor in Chengdu, Sichuan, and establishes the state of Shu Han.

=== 222 ===
==== By place ====
====== Roman Empire ======
- March 13 – Emperor Elagabalus is assassinated, along with his mother, Julia Soaemias, by the Praetorian Guard during a revolt. Their mutilated bodies are dragged through the streets of Rome before being thrown into the Tiber.
- Alexander Severus succeeds Elagabalus. He is only 13 years old; his mother, Julia Avita Mamaea, governs the Roman Empire with the help of Domitius Ulpianus and a council composed of 16 senators.

====== China ======
- Battle of Xiaoting/Yiling: The Chinese state of Shu Han is defeated by Eastern Wu.

==== By topic ====
====== Commerce ======
- The silver content of the Roman denarius falls to 35 percent under emperor Alexander Severus, down from 43 percent under Elagabalus.

====== Religion ======
- October 14 – Pope Callixtus I is killed by a mob in Rome's Trastevere after a 5-year reign in which he has stabilized the Saturday fast three times per year, with no food, oil, or wine to be consumed on those days. Callixtus is succeeded by Cardinal Urban I.

=== 223 ===
==== By place ====
====== Asia ======
- Battle of Dongkou: The Chinese state of Cao Wei is defeated by Eastern Wu.

=== 224 ===
==== Roman Empire ====
- January 1 – Gaius Bellicius Torquatus and Appius Claudius Julianus II begin their one year terms as the new Roman consuls.

====== Parthia ======
- April 28 – Battle of Hormozdgan: King Ardashir I defeats Artabanus V, destroying the Parthian Empire, and establishing the Sassanid Dynasty. Artabanus V's brother Vologases VI will continue to rule, with Armenian and Kushan support, over outlying parts of Parthia.

=== 225 ===
==== By place ====
====== Roman Empire ======
- Emperor Alexander Severus marries Sallustia Orbiana, and possibly raises her father Seius Sallustius to the rank of Caesar.

==== By topic ====
====== Art and Science ======
- The first Christian paintings appear in Rome, decorating the Catacombs.

=== 226 ===
==== By place ====
====== China ======
- A merchant from the Roman Empire, called "Qin Lun" by the Chinese, arrives in Jiaozhi (modern Hanoi), and is taken to see King Sun Quan of Eastern Wu, who requests him to make a report on his native country and people. He is given an escort for the return trip, including a present of ten male and ten female "blackish-colored dwarfs." However, the officer in charge of the Chinese escort dies, and Qin Lun has to continue his journey home alone.

====== Parthian Empire ======
- Ctesiphon, until now capital of the Parthian Empire, falls into the hands of the Sasanian Empire, who also make it their capital, after putting an end to the Parthian Dynasty in Iran.

=== 227 ===
==== By place ====
====== Roman Empire ======
- Seius Sallustius is executed for the attempted murder of his son-in-law, Emperor Alexander Severus. Sallustius' daughter, as well as Alexander's wife, Sallustia Orbiana, is exiled to Libya.

====== Ireland ======
- The rule of High King Cormac mac Airt begins (approximate).

====== Persian Empire ======
- King Ardashir I annexes his new empire from the east to the northwest. He conquers, with his army, the provinces of Chorasmia, Sistan and the island Bahrain in the Persian Gulf. The kings of the Kushan Empire and Turan recognize Ardashir as their overlord.

====== Asia ======
- Dongcheon becomes ruler over the Korean kingdom of Goguryeo.

=== 228 ===
==== By place ====
====== Roman Empire ======
- Domitius Ulpianus, a Roman jurist and prefect, is assassinated by the Praetorian Guard, in the presence of Emperor Severus Alexander. His curtailment of the privileges of the palace guard becomes Ulpianus' downfall, who in the course of a riot at Rome is murdered, between the soldiers and the mob.

====== Persian Empire ======
- King Ardashir I, four years after establishing the Sassanid Persian Empire, completes his conquest of Parthia.

====== China ======
- c. February – May – Battle of Jieting: The Cao Wei Kingdom decisively defeats the Shu Han Kingdom.
- June –October – Battle of Shiting: The Eastern Wu Kingdom defeats the Cao Wei Kingdom.

=== 229 ===
==== By place ====
====== Roman Empire ======
- Emperor Alexander Severus and Dio Cassius are joint Consuls.

====== China ======
- February – May – Battle of Jianwei: The state of Shu Han is victorious over the state of Cao Wei.
- June 23 – Chinese warlord Sun Quan formally declares himself emperor of the Eastern Wu state. The city of Jianye (modern Nanjing) is founded as the capital of Eastern Wu. The independent kingdoms in Cambodia and Laos become Eastern Wu vassals.
- Eastern Wu merchants reach Vietnam; ocean transport is improved to such an extent that sea journeys are made to the Liaodong Peninsula and the island of Yizhou.

==== By topic ====
====== Art and Science ======
- Ammonius Saccas renews Greek philosophy by creating Neoplatonism.

== Births ==
220

- Wei Guan, Chinese official of the Cao Wei state and the Western Jin dynasty (d. 291)

221

- Liu Ling, Chinese poet and scholar (d. 300)
- Yang Hu, Chinese general and politician (d. 278)

222

- Marcus Aurelius Carus, Roman emperor (d. 283)
- Du Yu (or Yuankai), Chinese general and politician (d. 285)

223

- Ji Kang, Chinese poet and philosopher (d. 262)
- Wang Hun, Chinese general and politician (d. 297)

224

- Jungcheon of Goguryeo, Korean ruler (d. 270)
- Liu Xuan (or Wenheng), Chinese prince (d. 264)
- Marcus Aurelius Carus, Roman emperor (d. 283)
- Mercurius, Christian saint and martyr (d. 250)
- Pei Xiu, Chinese official and politician (d. 271)
- Sun He (courtesy name Zixiao), Chinese prince (d. 253)

225

- January 20 – Gordian III, Roman emperor (d. 244)
- December 26 – Lawrence, Christian martyr (d. 258)
- Trieu Thi Trinh, Vietnamese female warrior (d. 248)
- Zhong Hui, Chinese general and politician (d. 264)

226

- Lu Kang, Chinese general and politician (d. 274)
- Wang Bi (or Fusi), Chinese philosopher (d. 249)
- Saint Valentine, Roman patron saint (d. 269)

227

- Herennius Etruscus, Roman emperor (d. 251)
- Sima Zhou, Chinese prince and general (d. 283)
- Zhuge Zhan, Chinese general and official (d. 263)

228

- Paul of Thebes, Christian hermit (approximate date)
- Wang Fan, Chinese politician and astronomer (d. 266)

== Deaths ==
220

- March 15 – Cao Cao, Chinese warlord of the Eastern Han dynasty (b. 155)
- June 13 – Xiahou Dun, Chinese general serving under the Eastern Han dynasty warlord Cao Cao
- December – Cheng Yu, Chinese official serving under the Eastern Han dynasty warlord Cao Cao (b. 141)
- Fa Zheng, Chinese official serving under the Eastern Han dynasty warlord Liu Bei (b. 176)
- Guan Yu, Chinese general serving under the Eastern Han dynasty warlord Liu Bei
- Guan Ping, son of Guan Yu
- Huang Zhong, Chinese general serving under the Eastern Han dynasty warlord Liu Bei
- Lü Meng, Chinese general serving under the Eastern Han dynasty warlord Sun Quan (b. 178)
- Bassilla, Roman actress, dancer and singer (approximate year)
- Tertullian, first Christian author to produce an extensive corpus of Latin Christian literature (b. 155)

221

- August 4 – Lady Zhen, Chinese noblewoman (b. 183)
- Dong He (or Youzai), Chinese official and politician
- Mi Zhu, Chinese general and politician (b. 165)
- Yu Jin, Chinese general serving under Cao Cao
- Zhang Fei, Chinese general and politician

222

- Elagabalus, Roman emperor (b. 203)
- Julia Soaemias, mother of Elagabalus (b. 180)
- Annia Faustina, Roman noblewoman and empress
- Bardaisan, Syriac scholar and philosopher (b. 154)
- Callixtus I, pope of the Catholic Church
- Cheng Ji (or Jiran), Chinese general
- Feng Xi (or Xiuyuan), Chinese general
- Hierocles, favourite and lover of Elagabalus
- Liu Ba (or Zichu), Chinese official and politician
- Ma Chao, Chinese general and warlord (b. 176)
- Ma Liang, Chinese diplomat and politician (b. 187)
- Xu Jing (or Wenxiu), Chinese official and politician
- Zhang Liao (or Wenyuan), Chinese general (b. 169)

223

- May 6 – Cao Ren (or Zixiao), Chinese general (b. 168)
- June 10 – Liu Bei, Chinese warlord and emperor (b. 161)
- August 1 – Cao Zhang, Chinese prince and warlord
- August 11 – Jia Xu, Chinese official and politician (b. 147)
- Xing Yong (or Zi'ang), Chinese official and politician
- Zhang Ji (or Derong), Chinese official and politician

224

- April 28 – Artabanus IV, king of Parthia
- Du Ji, Chinese official and politician
- Ji Yan, Chinese official and politician
- Zhu Zhi, Chinese general and politician (b. 156)

225

- Gaius Vettius Gratus Sabinianus, Roman consul
- Gong Lu, Chinese official and politician (b. 195)
- Sun Shao, Chinese official and chancellor (b. 163)
- Xiahou Shang, Chinese general and politician

226

- June 29 – Cao Pi, Chinese emperor (b. 187)
- Farn-Sasan, king of the Parthian Kingdom
- Shi Xie, Chinese politician and warlord (b. 137)
- Xiahou Shang (or Boren), Chinese general

227

- Han Dang (or Yigong), Chinese general
- He Qi (or Gongmiao), Chinese general
- Seius Sallustius, Roman usurper (Caesar)
- Shi Hui, Chinese official and general (b. 165)
- Xu Huang (or Gongming), Chinese general

228

- Cao Xiu, Chinese general of the Cao Wei state
- Domitius Ulpianus, Roman jurist and prefect (b. 170)
- Jia Kui, Chinese general of the Cao Wei state (b. 174)
- Lü Fan, Chinese general of the Eastern Wu state
- Luo Tong, Chinese official and general (b. 193)
- Ma Su, Chinese general of the Shu Han state (b. 190)
- Meng Da, Chinese general of the Cao Wei state
- Wang Lang, Chinese official of the Cao Wei state
- Zhuge Qiao, Chinese official and general (b. 204)

229

- Cao Li, Chinese prince of the Cao Wei state (b. 208)
- Cao Yong, Chinese prince of the Cao Wei state
- Zhao Yun, Chinese general of the Shu Han state
