= 155 =

155 may refer to:

- AD 155, a year
- 155 BC, a year
- 155 (number), the natural number following 154 and preceding 156
- 155 (New Jersey bus), United States
- 155 (Wessex) Transport Regiment (Volunteers)
- RCH 155, a wheeled self-propelled howitzer
- Alfa Romeo 155, a compact executive sedan
- UFC 155, a mixed martial arts event held by the Ultimate Fighting Championship
- SMArt 155, a German 155 mm artillery round designed for a long-range, indirect fire top-attack role against armoured vehicles

== See also ==
- Class 155 (disambiguation)
- NH 155 (disambiguation)
