= Xing (surname) =

Chinese surname

- Xing surname in regular script
- Pronunciation: Xíng (Pinyin); Hêng (Pe̍h-ōe-jī); Yìng (Guangdong Romanization)
- Language: Chinese, Vietnamese, Korean

Origin
- Language: Old Chinese

Other names
- Variant forms: Xing, Hsing (Mandarin); Heng (Hokkien); Hình (Vietnamese)

Xing (Chinese: 邢) is a Chinese surname. There are two hypothesized sources for the extant catalogue of surnames:

1. According to the Yuanhe Xing Zuan, Xing is originated from Ji (姬), the royal family of Zhou dynasty in China. The fourth son of the Duke of Zhou, was appointed the ruler of the State of Xing (now Xingtai city of Hebei Province). The year 662 BC saw the State of Xing taken over by the State of Wei, and the noble descendants entitled themselves their former state name as their surnames.

2. According to Xing Kao (zh:姓考), or Surname Investigation, in the Spring and Autumn period, Dafu (zh:大夫) Han Xuanzi of the State of Jin, along with his family and offspring resided in Xing county (now east of Wen county of Henan Province), and later his descendants had the surname Xing after the county name.

== Notable people ==
- Xing Yong (邢顒; died 223), official of the state of Cao Wei in the Three Kingdoms period
- Xing Wenwei (邢文偉; died 690?), Tang dynasty official under Emperor Ruizong
- Xing Zhaotang (邢肇棠; 1894–1961), People's Republic of China politician
- Xing Rongjie (邢荣杰; 1911–1997), People's Liberation Army general
- Xing Qiyi (邢其毅; 1911–2002), Chinese organic chemist
- Xing Chongzhi (邢崇智; 1927–2000), Chinese politician
- Xing Qiuhen (邢球痕; 1930–2024), Chinese scientist
- Seing Koo Wan (邢谷环; 1933/1934–1992) Singaporean taxi driver and murder victim
- Xing Shizhong (邢世忠; 1938–2019), People's Liberation Army general
- Michael Ying (邢李㷧; born 1949), Hong Kong billionaire, former chairman of Esprit Holdings
- Xing Yun (邢云; born 1952), Chinese politician
- Hsing Yin Shean (邢荣顯; 1956–2021), Malaysian politician, former Member of Parliament
- Margaret Heng (邢紫薇; born 1961), Singaporean hotelier
- Joseph Xing Wenzhi (邢文之; born 1963), Chinese Roman Catholic auxiliary bishop in the Diocese of Shanghai
- Xing Haiming (邢海明; born 1964), Chinese diplomat
- Xing Wen (邢文; born 1965), Chinese art historian
- Xing Danwen (邢丹文; born 1967), Chinese artist and photographer
- Abigail Hing Wen (邢立美; born 1977), American writer, film producer, director and speaker
- Xing Aihua (邢愛華; born 1978), Chinese long-track speed skater
- Xing Lin (邢琳; born 1979), Chinese triathlete
- Xing Aowei (邢傲伟; born 1982), Chinese gymnast
- Alfred Hsing (邢思傑; born 1983), American martial artist, actor, and stuntman
- Xing Yan'an (邢衍安; born 1983), Chinese sprinter
- Xing Huina (邢慧娜; born 1984), Chinese middle-distance runner
- Xing Shucai (born 1984), Chinese race walker
- Nadia Heng (邢敏敦; born 1985), Malaysian beauty pageant winner
- Xing Kai (邢凯; born 1989), Chinese footballer
- Yan Dong Xing (邢彦东; born 1985), Chinese racing cyclist
- Xing Aiying (邢爱英; born 1989), Chinese-born Singaporean badminton player
- Xing Yu (archer) (邢宇; born 1991), Chinese archer
- Xing Song (邢宇; born 1994), Chinese sprint canoeist
- Ariel Hsing (邢延華; born 1995), American table tennis player
- Xing Yu (footballer) (邢瑜; born 1996), Chinese football goalkeeper (Chinese Super League)
- Xing Zhaolin (邢昭林; born 1997), Chinese actor, model and singer
- Xing Jianing (邢珈宁; born 2001), Chinese ice dancer
- Xing Zihao (邢子豪; born 2004), Chinese snooker player
- Eric Xing (邢波), researcher in machine learning, computational biology, and statistical methodology at Carnegie Mellon University
