= 223 =

223 in various calendars
- Gregorian calendar: 223; CCXXIII
- Ab urbe condita: 976
- Assyrian calendar: 4973
- Balinese saka calendar: 144–145
- Bengali calendar: −371 – −370
- Berber calendar: 1173
- Buddhist calendar: 767
- Burmese calendar: −415
- Byzantine calendar: 5731–5732
- Chinese calendar: 壬寅年 (Water Tiger); 2920 or 2713 — to — 癸卯年 (Water Rabbit); 2921 or 2714
- Coptic calendar: −61 – −60
- Discordian calendar: 1389
- Ethiopian calendar: 215–216
- Hebrew calendar: 3983–3984
- Hindu calendars
- Vikram Samvat: 279–280
- Shaka Samvat: 144–145
- Kali Yuga: 3323–3324
- Holocene calendar: 10223
- Iranian calendar: 399 BP – 398 BP
- Islamic calendar: 411 BH – 410 BH
- Javanese calendar: 101–102
- Julian calendar: 223; CCXXIII
- Korean calendar: 2556
- Minguo calendar: 1689 before ROC 民前1689年
- Nanakshahi calendar: −1245
- Seleucid era: 534/535 AG
- Thai solar calendar: 765–766
- Tibetan calendar: ཆུ་ཕོ་སྟག་ལོ་ (male Water-Tiger); 349 or −32 or −804 — to — ཆུ་མོ་ཡོས་ལོ་ (female Water-Hare); 350 or −31 or −803

Year 223 (CCXXIII) was a common year starting on Wednesday of the Julian calendar. At the time, it was known as the Year of the Consulship of Maximus and Aelianus (or, less frequently, year 976 Ab urbe condita). The denomination 223 for this year has been used since the early medieval period, when the Anno Domini calendar era became the prevalent method in Europe for naming years.

== Events ==
=== By place ===
==== Asia ====
- Battle of Dongkou: The Chinese state of Cao Wei is defeated by Eastern Wu.

== Births ==
- Ji Kang, Chinese poet and philosopher (d. 262)
- Wang Hun, Chinese general and politician (d. 297)

== Deaths ==
- May 6 – Cao Ren (or Zixiao), Chinese general (b. 168)
- June 10 – Liu Bei, Chinese warlord and emperor (b. 161)
- August 1 – Cao Zhang, Chinese prince and warlord
- August 11 – Jia Xu, Chinese official and politician (b. 147)
- Xing Yong (or Zi'ang), Chinese official and politician
- Zhang Ji (or Derong), Chinese official and politician
