= 298 =

298 in various calendars
Gregorian calendar	298; CCXCVIII
Ab urbe condita	1051
Assyrian calendar	5048
Balinese saka calendar	219–220
Bengali calendar	−296 – −295
Berber calendar	1248
Buddhist calendar	842
Burmese calendar	−340
Byzantine calendar	5806–5807
Chinese calendar	丁巳年 (Fire Snake); 2995 or 2788 — to — 戊午年 (Earth Horse); 2996 or 2789
Coptic calendar	14–15
Discordian calendar	1464
Ethiopian calendar	290–291
Hebrew calendar	4058–4059
- Hindu calendars
Vikram Samvat	354–355
Shaka Samvat	219–220
Kali Yuga	3398–3399
Holocene calendar	10298
Iranian calendar	324 BP – 323 BP
Islamic calendar	334 BH – 333 BH
Javanese calendar	178–179
Julian calendar	298; CCXCVIII
Korean calendar	2631
Minguo calendar	1614 before ROC 民前1614年
Nanakshahi calendar	−1170
Seleucid era	609/610 AG
Thai solar calendar	840–841
Tibetan calendar	མེ་མོ་སྦྲུལ་ལོ་ (female Fire-Snake); 424 or 43 or −729 — to — ས་ཕོ་རྟ་ལོ་ (male Earth-Horse); 425 or 44 or −728

Year 298 (CCXCVIII) was a common year starting on Saturday of the Julian calendar. At the time, it was known as the Year of the Consulship of Faustus and Gallus (or, less frequently, year 1051 Ab urbe condita). The denomination 298 for this year has been used since the early medieval period, when the Anno Domini calendar era became the prevalent method in Europe for naming years.

== Events ==
=== By place ===
==== Roman Empire ====
- Spring: Emperor Diocletian retakes Alexandria and crushes the usurpation of Aurelius Achilleus.
- Diocletian then travels into Upper Egypt and possibly campaigns on the Nubian frontier. In either this year or in 300/301, he makes agreements with the Meroitic Nubians and the Blemmyes. He agrees to pay subsidies to both peoples, and he cedes the Dodecashoenos to the Nubians on the understanding that the Nubians will defend the region against the Blemmyes.
- Caesar Galerius restores Tiridates III to the throne of Armenia and invades the Sassanid Empire. His army marches through Adiabene, Atropatene, Susiana and Lower Mesopotamia. He then retakes the strategically important city of Nisibis in Upper Mesopotamia.

==== Korea ====
- The manufacture of cultured silk becomes popular from Korea to Japan.
- Bunseo becomes king of the Korean kingdom of Baekje.
- Girim becomes the king of the Korean kingdom of Silla.

== Births ==
- Athanasius of Alexandria, Egyptian patriarch (d. 373)

== Deaths ==
- Aurelius Achilleus, Roman usurper
- Cassian of Tangier, Christian martyr
- Chaekgye of Baekje, Korean ruler
- Marcellus of Tangier, Christian martyr
- Yurye of Silla (or Yuri), Korean ruler
