= 174 =

174 may refer to:

- 174 (number), the natural number following 173 and preceding 175
- 174 BC
- AD 174
- UFC 174
- 174 Phaedra
- Interstate 174
- Lectionary 174
- Radical 174

== See also ==
- Namur 174 (disambiguation)
