= Pompey's Pillar =

Ancient Roman triumphal column

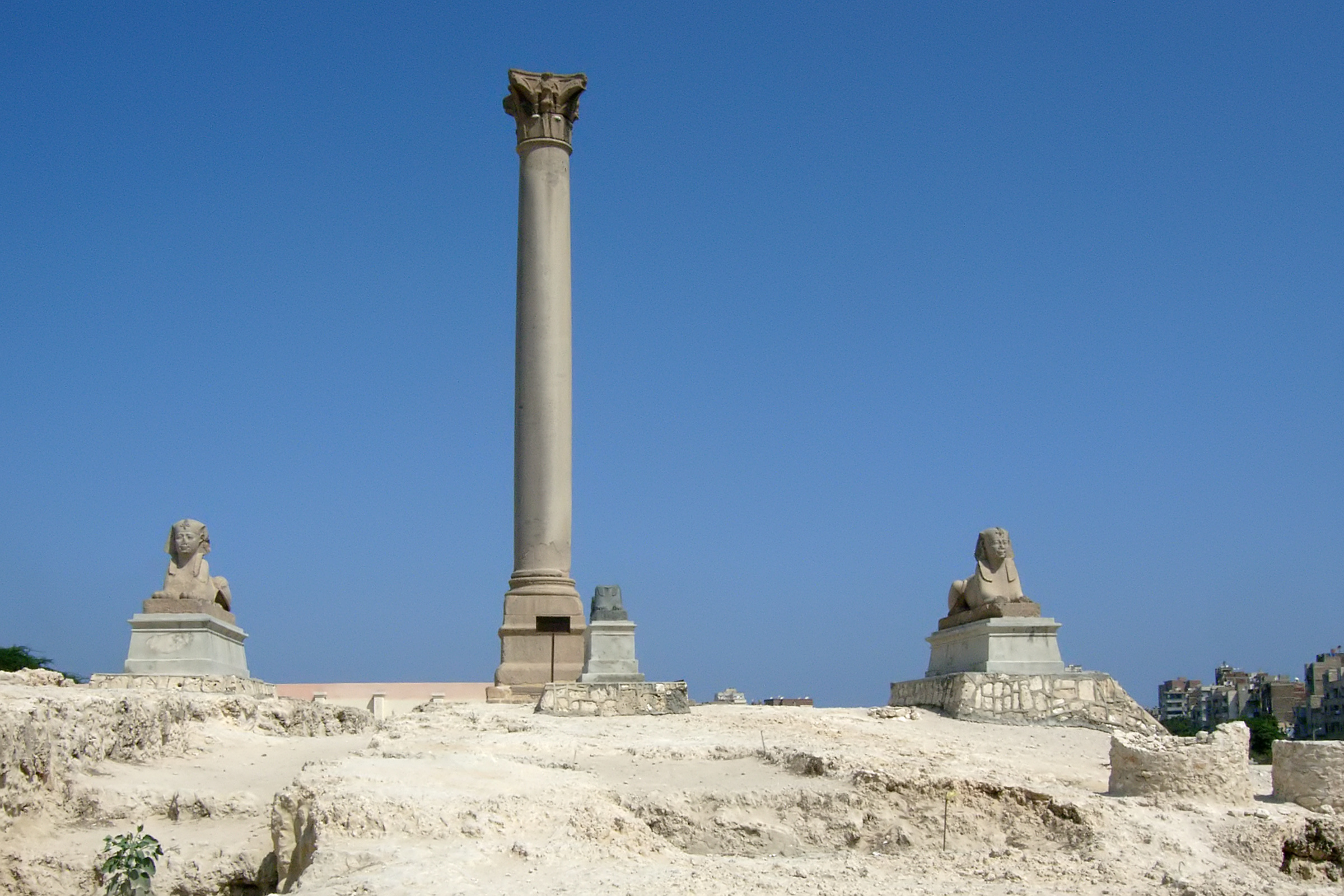
- Pompey's Pillar

- Location within Egypt
- 31°10′57″N 29°53′47.1″E
- Type: Roman triumphal column
- Location: Alexandria, Egypt

History
- Built: AD 298-303; 1723 years ago (dedicated)
- Built by: Publius praefectus aegypti on behalf of emperor Diocletian

Site notes
- Material: granite, lost statue in porphyry
- Height: c. 33.85 m (total original with 7 m statue) 26.85 m (present total); 20.75 m (monolithic granite column shaft) 6 m (granite socle)
- Diameter: c. 2.7-2.8 m (column shaft)

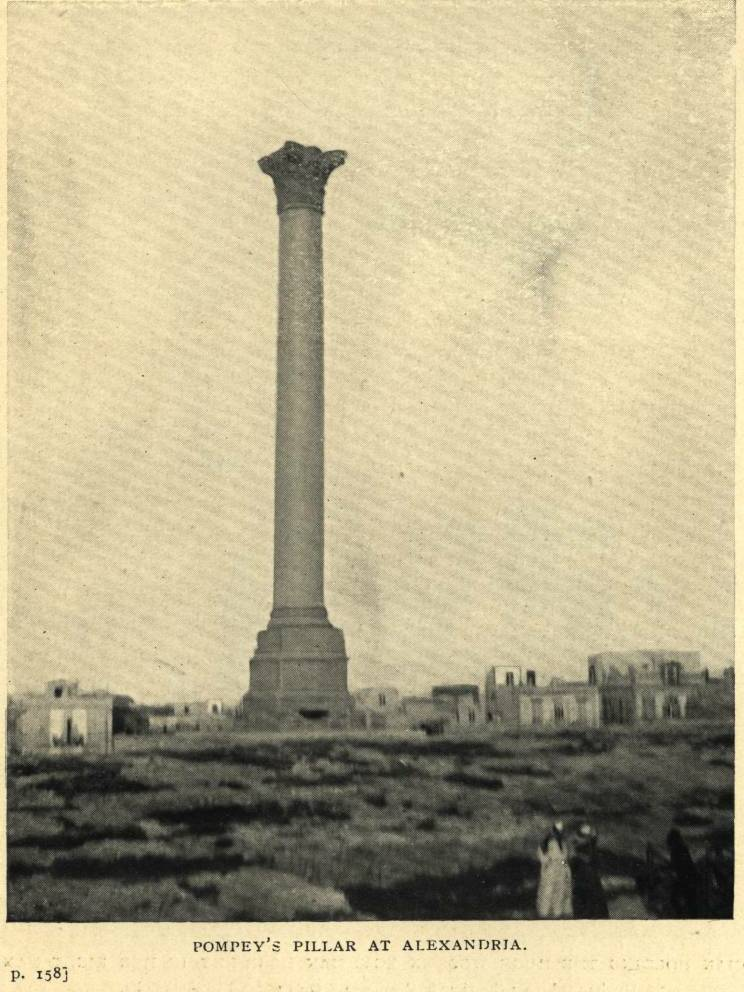
Pompey's Pillar in 1911

Pompey's Pillar (Arabic: عمود السواري, romanized: 'Amud El-Sawari) is a Roman triumphal column in Alexandria, Egypt. Despite its modern name, it was actually set up in honour of the Roman emperor Diocletian between 298–302 AD. The giant Corinthian column originally supported a colossal porphyry statue of the emperor in armour. It stands at the eastern side of the temenos of the Serapeum of Alexandria, which is now in ruins.

It is the only ancient monument in Alexandria that is still standing in its original location.

== Name ==
The local name is Arabic: عمود السواري, romanized: 'Amud El-Sawari, where the word 'Amud means "column". The name Sawari has been translated in many ways by scholars, including Severus (i.e. Emperor Septimius Severus).

The name of Pompey in relation to the pillar was used by many European writers in early modern times. The name is considered to stem from a historical misreading of the Greek dedicatory inscription on the base; the name ΠΟΥΠΛΙΟΣ (Πού̣π̣[λιος], Pouplios) was confused with ΠΟΜΠΗΙΟΣ (Ancient Greek: Πομπήιος, romanized: Pompeios).

== Construction ==
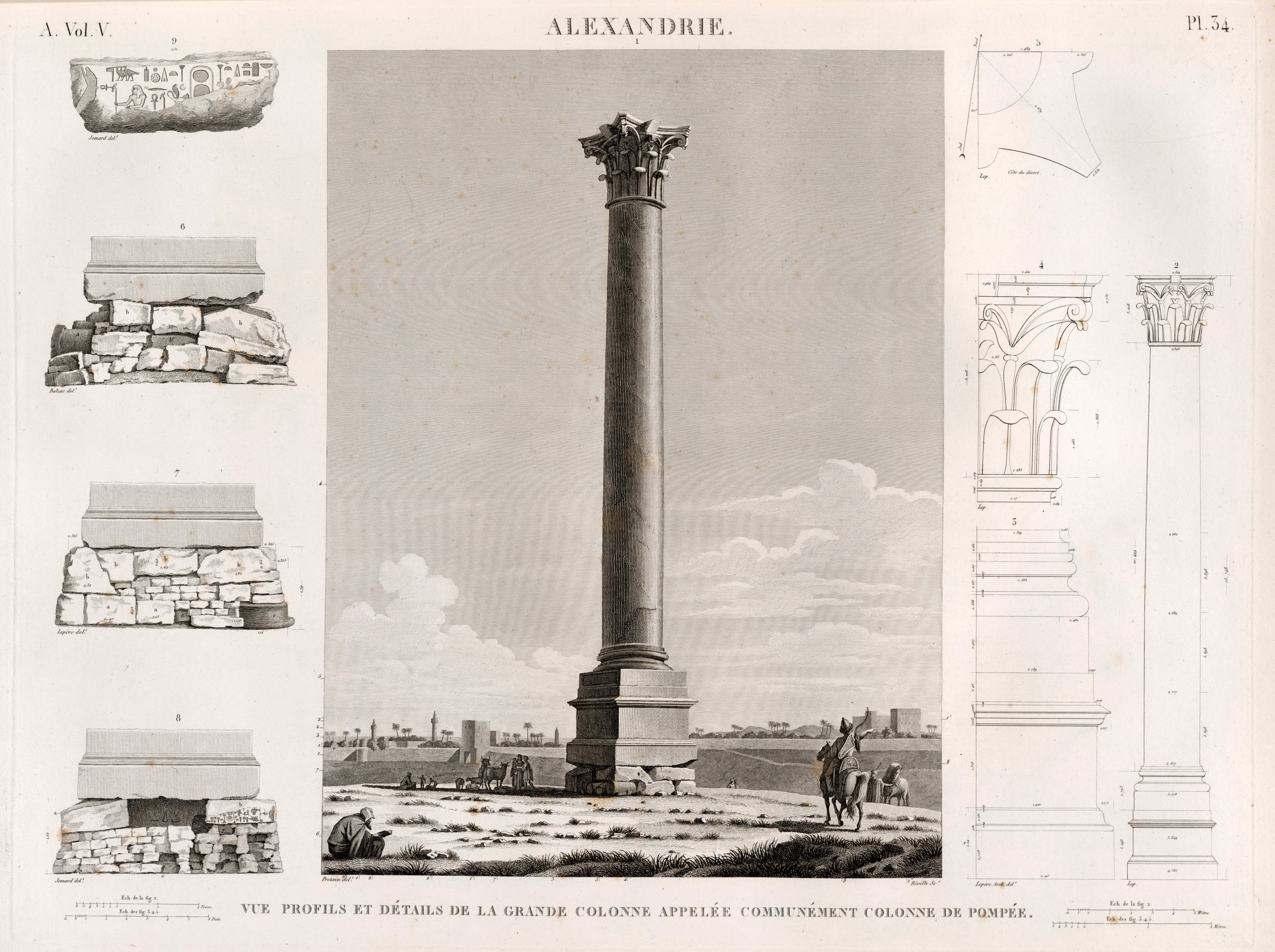
Profile and details of Pompey's Pillar,Description de l'Égypte, 1809

In 297 Diocletian, Augustus since 284, campaigned in Egypt to suppress the revolt of the usurper Domitius Domitianus. After a long siege, Diocletian captured Alexandria and executed Domitianus's successor Aurelius Achilleus in 298. In 302 the emperor returned to the city and inaugurated a state grain supply. The dedication of the column monument and its statue of Diocletian, describes Diocletian as polioúchos (Ancient Greek: πολιοῦχον Ἀλεξανδρείας, romanized: polioúchon Alexandreias, lit. 'city-guardian-god ACC of Alexandria'). In the fourth century AD this designation also applied to Serapis, the male counterpart of Isis in the pantheon instituted by the Hellenistic rulers of Egypt, the Ptolemies. The sanctuary complex dedicated to Serapis in which the column was originally erected, the Serapeum, was built under King Ptolemy III Euergetes in the third century BC and rebuilt under Roman rule, likely in the late 2nd to early 3rd century CE, being completed under Emperor Caracalla. In the later fourth century AD it was considered by Ammianus Marcellinus a marvel rivalled only by Rome's sanctuary to Jupiter Optimus Maximus on the Capitoline Hill, the Capitolium.

The monument stands some 26.85 m (88.1 ft) high, including its base and capital, and originally would have supported a statue some 7 m (23 ft) tall. (Note: Other authors give slightly deviating dimensions. According to Thiel, the single-piece column is 20.75 m (68.1 ft) high (28.7 m (94 ft) including base and pedestal), with a diameter of 2.7–2.8 m (8 ft 10 in – 9 ft 2 in).) The only known monolithic column in Roman Egypt (i.e., not composed of drums), it is one of the largest ancient monoliths and one of the largest monolithic columns ever erected. The monolithic column shaft is 20.46 m (67.1 ft) in height with a diameter of 2.71 m (8 ft 11 in) at its base, and the socle itself is over 6 m (20 ft) tall. Both are of lapis syenites, a pink granite cut from the ancient quarries at Syene (modern Aswan), while the column capital of pseudo-Corinthian type is of grey granite. The weight of the column shaft is estimated to be 285 tonnes (314 short tons).

The surviving and readable four lines of the inscription in Greek on the column's socle relate that a Praefectus Aegypti (Ancient Greek: ἔπαρχος Αἰγύπτου, romanized: eparchos Aigyptou, lit. 'Eparch of Egypt') called Publius dedicated the monument in Diocletian's honour. A praefectus aegypti named Publius is attested in two papyri from Oxyrrhynchus; his governorship must have been held in between the prefectures of Aristius Optatus, who is named as governor on 16 March 297, and Clodius Culcianus, in office from 303 or even late 302. Since Publius's name appears as the monument's dedicator, the column and stylite statue of Diocletian must have been completed between 297 and 303, while he was in post. The governor's name is largely erased in the damaged inscription; the Greek rendering of Publius as ΠΟΥΠΛΙΟΣ (Πού̣π̣[λιος], Pouplios) was confused with the Greek spelling of the Republican general of the first century BC Pompey, ΠΟΜΠΗΙΟΣ (Ancient Greek: Πομπήιος, romanized: Pompeios, Latin: Pompeius).

The porphyry statue of Diocletian in armour is known from large fragments that existed at the column's foot in the eighteenth century AD. From the size of a 1.6 m (5 ft 3 in) fragment representing the thighs of the honorand, the original height of the loricate statue has been calculated at approximately 7 m (23 ft). While some fragments of the statue were known to be in European collections in the nineteenth century, their whereabouts were unknown by the 1930s and are presumed lost.

It is possible that the large column supporting Diocletian's statue was accompanied by another column, or three smaller columns bearing statues of Diocletian's co-emperors, the Augustus Maximian and the two Caesares Constantius and Galerius. If so, the group of column-statues would have commemorated the college of emperors of the Tetrarchy instituted in Diocletian's reign.

== Ascents ==
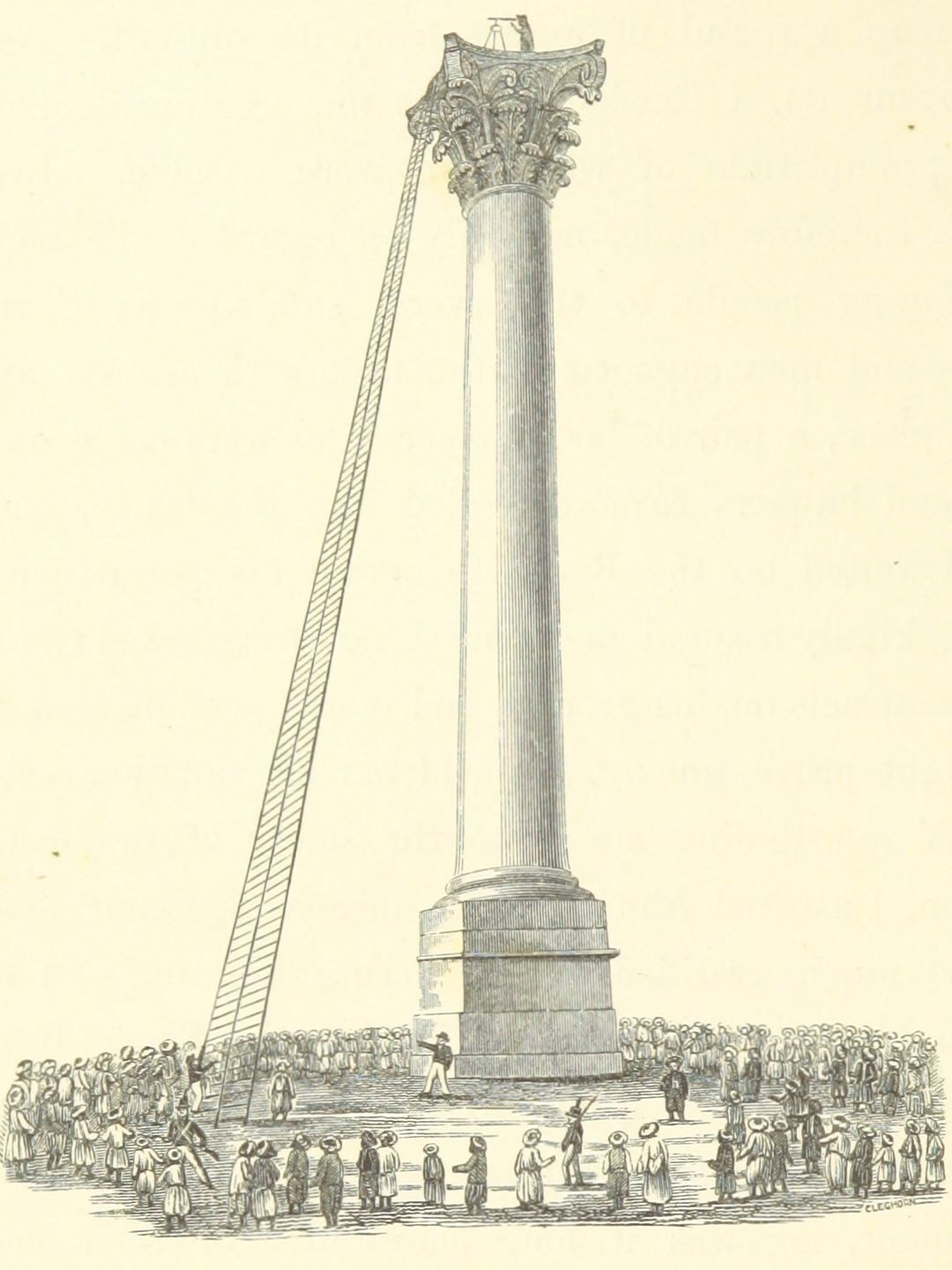
Commander John Shortland, R.N. atop the pillar with telescope (1803)

Muslim traveller Ibn Battuta visited Alexandria in 1326 AD. He describes the pillar and recounts the tale of an archer who shot an arrow tied to a string over the column. This enabled him to pull a rope tied to the string over the pillar and secure it on the other side in order to climb to the top of the pillar.

In early 1803, British naval officer Commander John Shortland of HMS Pandour flew a kite over Pompey's Pillar. This enabled him to get ropes over it, and then a rope ladder. On February 2, he and John White, Pandour's Master, climbed it. When they got to the top they displayed the Union Jack, drank a toast to King George III, and gave three cheers. Captain Ross Donnelly, of H. M.S. Narcissus, and Captain Silver, of his Majesty's 88th regiment of foot, were the only officers who ascended Pompey's Pillar with Shortland on the 2d of February, 1803. Four days later they climbed the pillar again, erected a staff, fixed a weather vane, ate a beef steak, and again toasted the king. An etymology of the nickname "Pompey" for the Royal Navy's home port of Portsmouth and its football team suggests these sailors became known as "Pompey's boys" after scaling the Pillar, and the moniker spread; other unrelated origins are also possible.

== Gallery ==
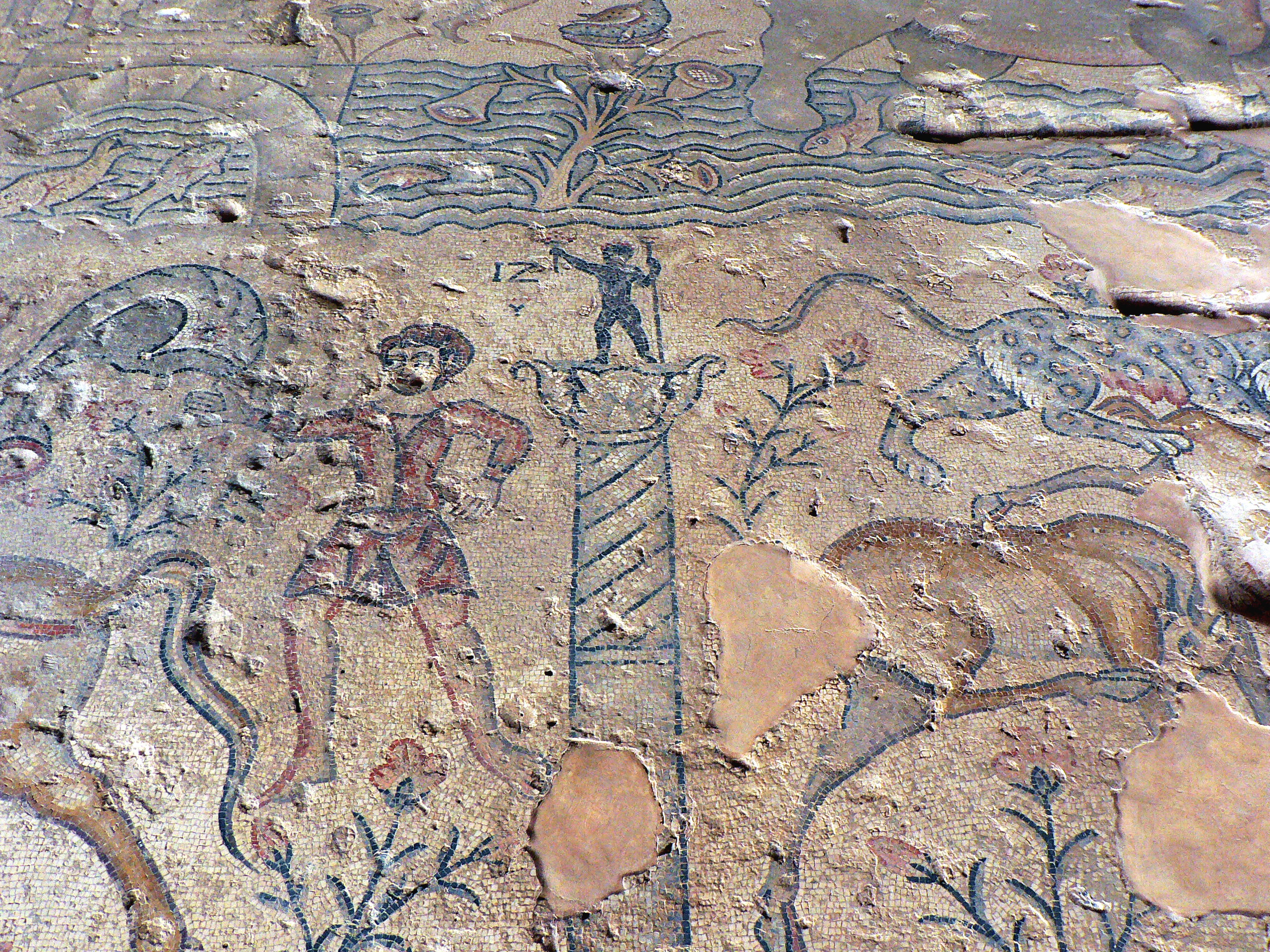
Pompey's Pillar represented in a mosaic from Sepphoris in Roman Palestine

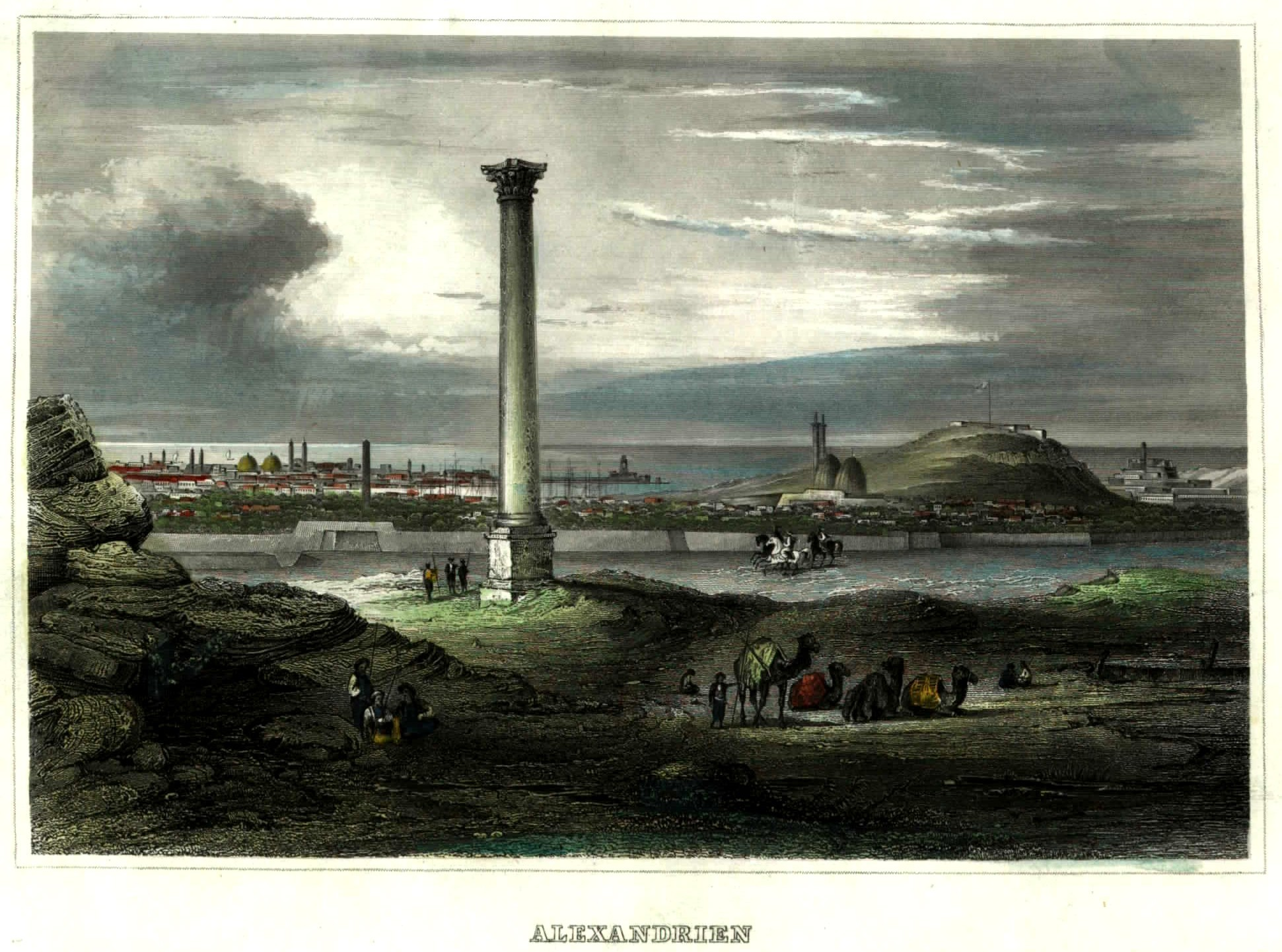
View of Pompey's Pillar with Alexandria in the background in c.1850

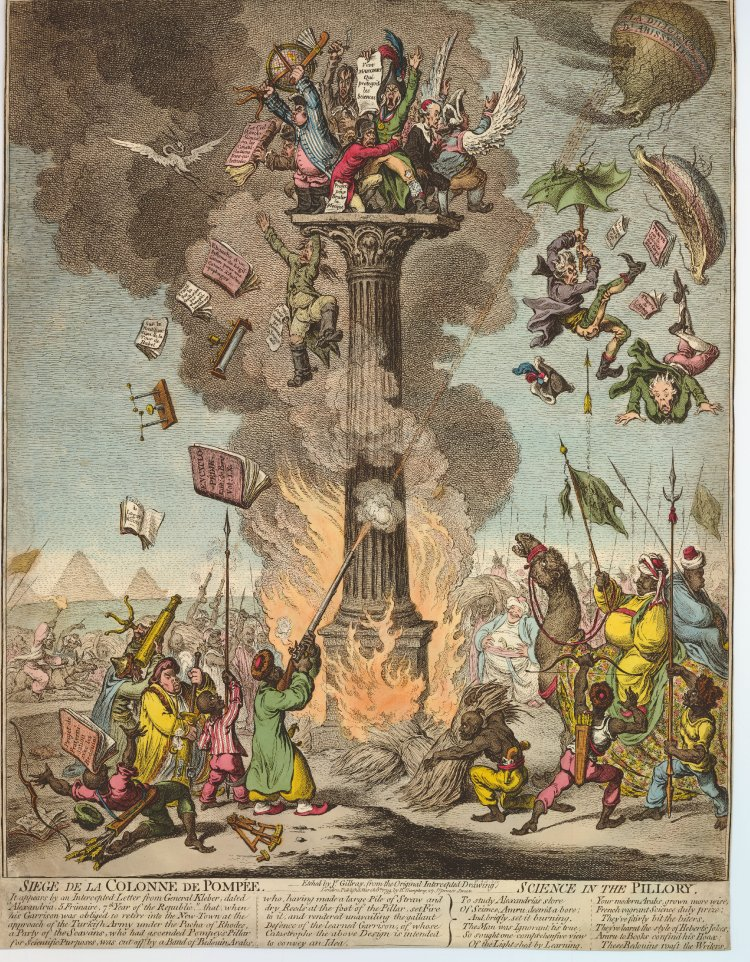
Siege de la Colonne de Pompée – Science in the pillory. 1799 cartoon, in which James Gillray lampoons the corps of scientists, artists and architects that travelled to Egypt as part of Napoleon's force

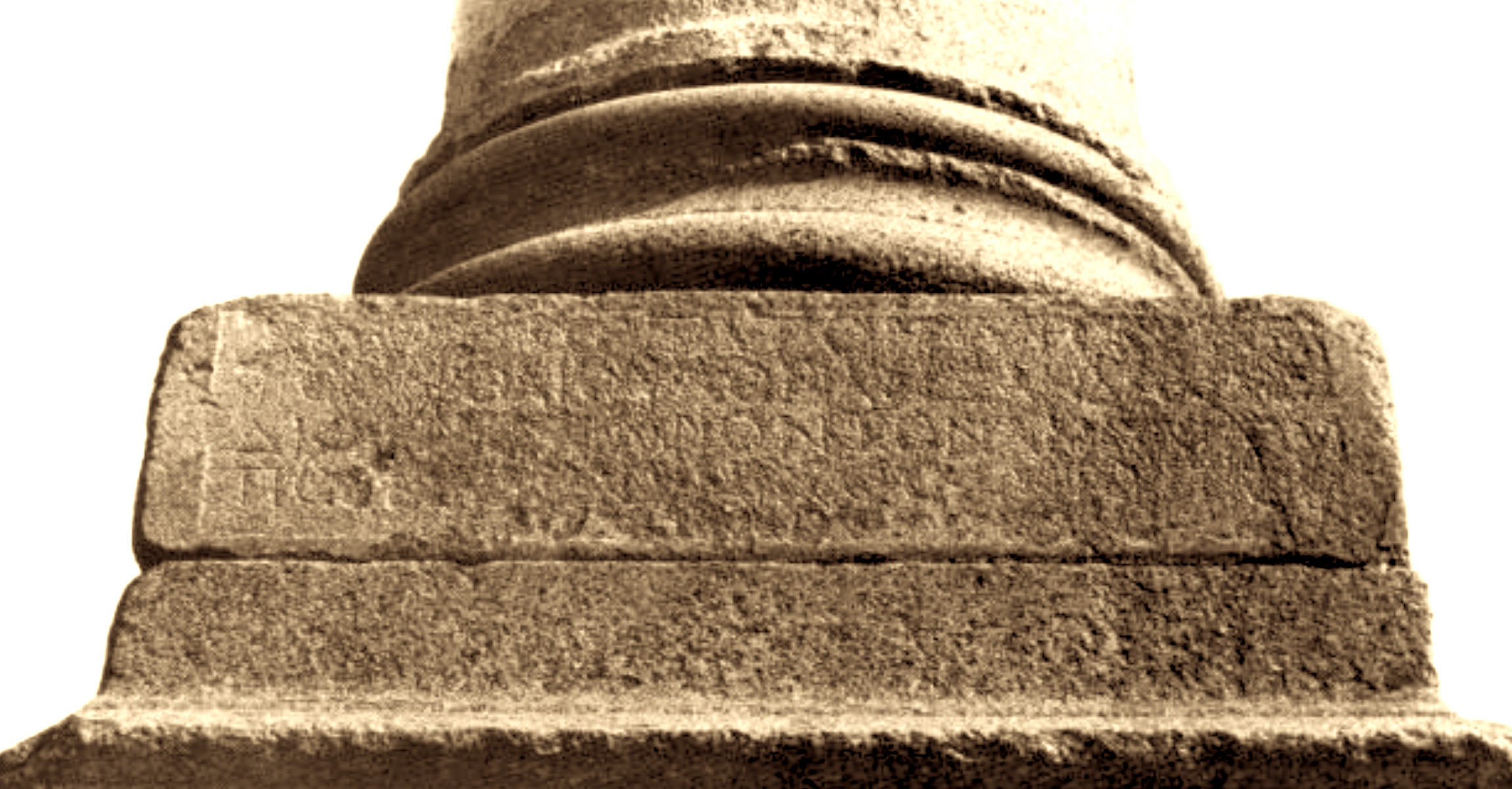
The Greek inscription

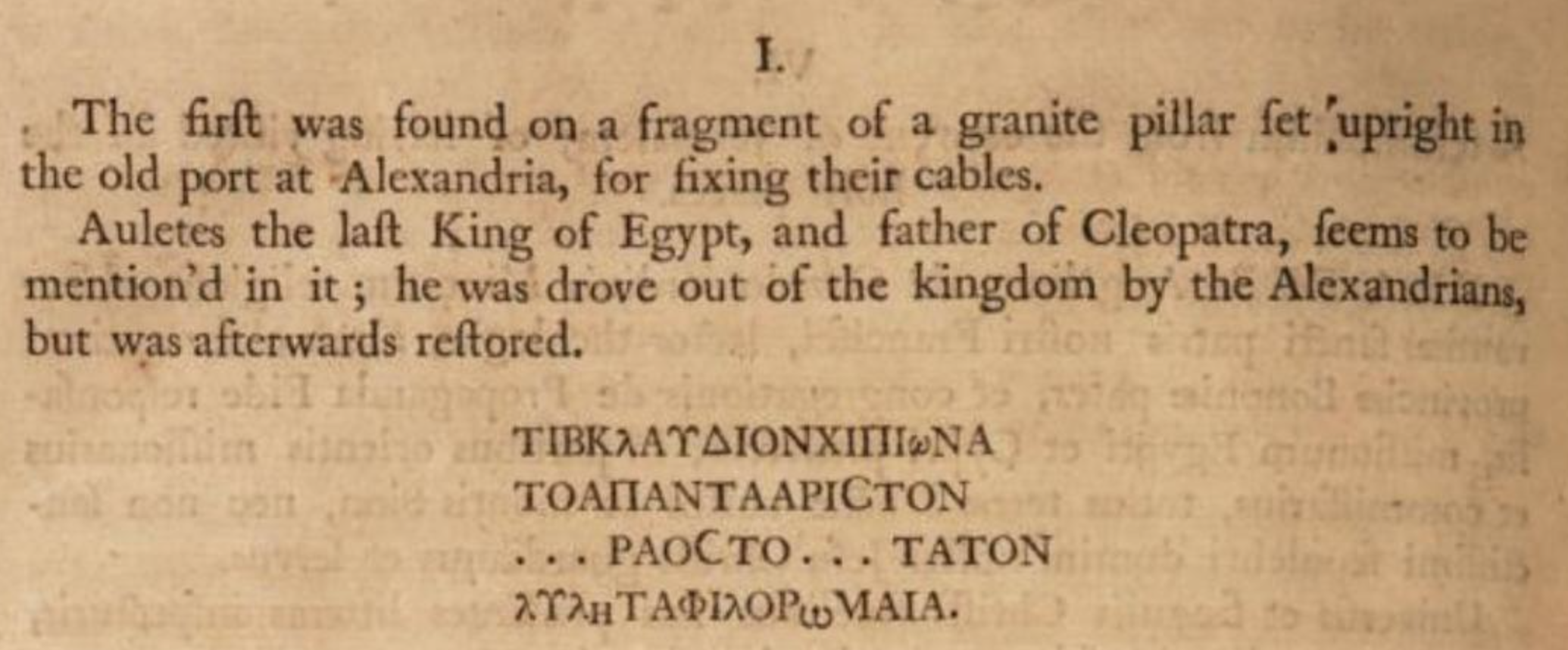
1743 version

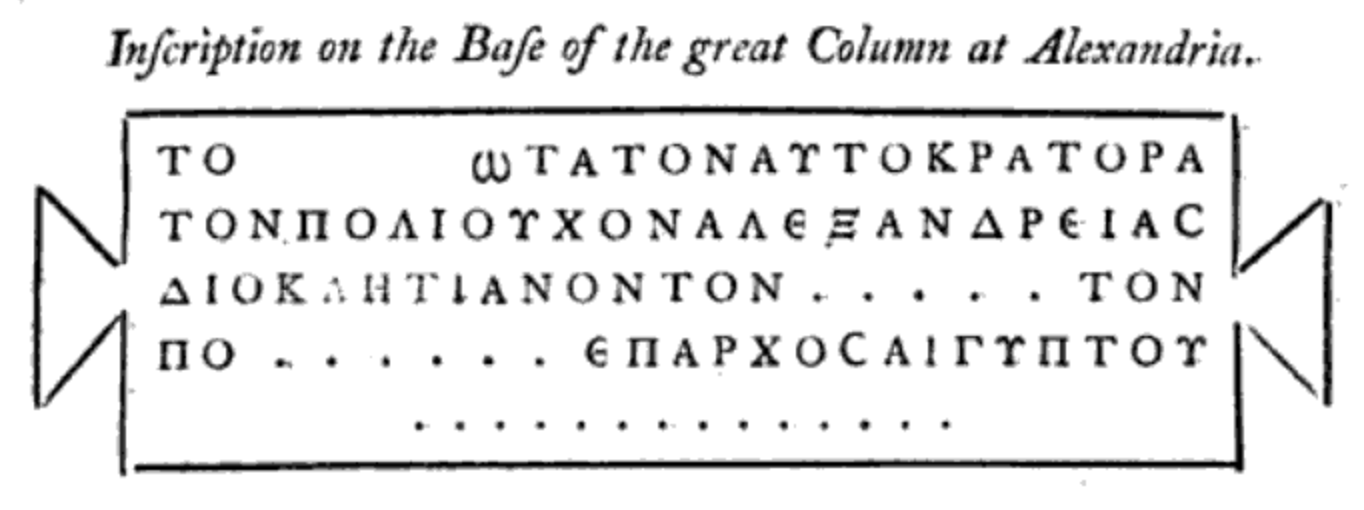
1803 version

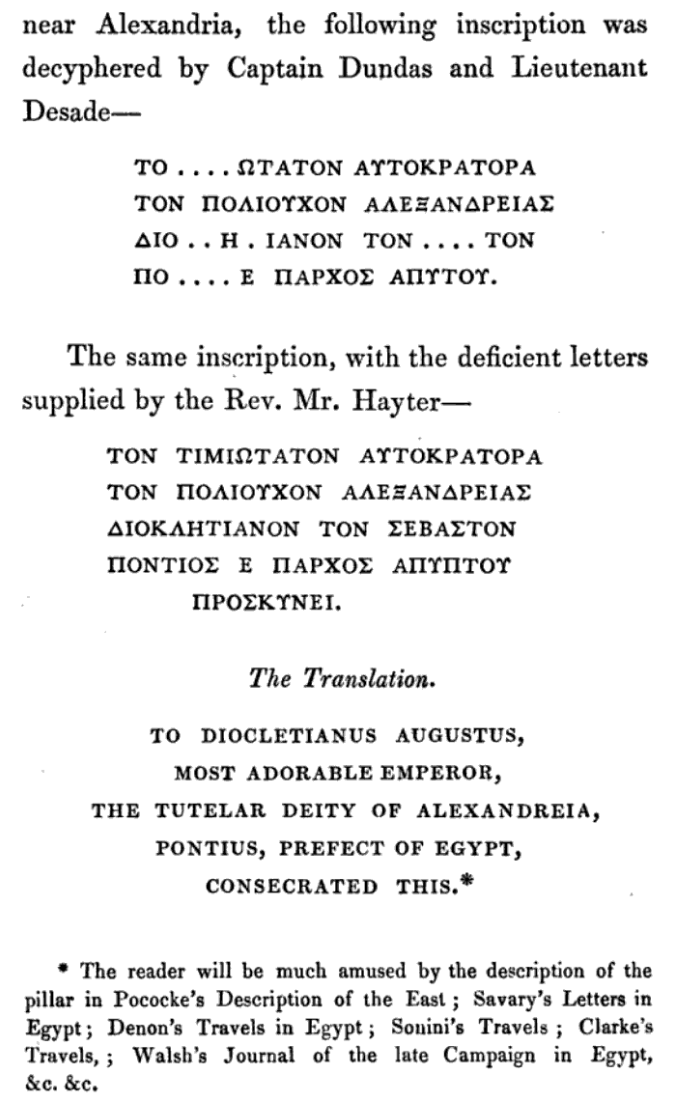
1822 version

== See also ==
- List of ancient architectural records
- Browne-Clayton Monument

== Sources ==
- White, Joseph (1801). Aegyptiaca: Or Observations on Certain Antiquities of Egypt: In Two Parts. The history of Pompey's pillar elucidated. Cadell & Davies.
- Adam, Jean-Pierre (1977). "À propos du trilithon de Baalbek: Le transport et la mise en oeuvre des megaliths". Syria. 54 (1–2): 31–63. doi:10.3406/syria.1977.6623. JSTOR 4198097.
- Delbrück, Richard (2007) [1932]. Antike Porphyrwerke. Berlin [reprinted: Rome]: de Guyter [reprinted L'Erma di Bretschneider]. ISBN 978-88-8265-454-2. OCLC 191032377.
- Kayser, F. (1994). Recueil des Inscriptions grecques et latines (non funéraires) d'Alexandrie impériale (in French). Cairo: Institut français d'archéologie orientale du Caire. ISBN 9782724701456.
- Thiel, W. (2006). "Die 'Pompeius-Säule' in Alexandria und die Vier-Säulen-Monumente Ägyptens". In Boschung, D.; Eck, W. (eds.). Die Tetrarchie: Ein neues Regierungssystem und seine mediale Repräsentation. Schriften des Lehr- und Forschungszentrums für die antiken Kulturen des Mittelmeerraumes. Wiesbaden: Reichert Verlag. pp. 251–270. ISBN 978-3895005107.
- Vandersleyen, C. (1958). Le préfet d'Égypte de la colonne de Pompée à Alexandrie. Chronique d’Égypte. Vol. 33. Brussels. pp. 113–134.
