= 297 =

297 in various calendars
- Gregorian calendar: 297; CCXCVII
- Ab urbe condita: 1050
- Assyrian calendar: 5047
- Balinese saka calendar: 218–219
- Bengali calendar: −297 – −296
- Berber calendar: 1247
- Buddhist calendar: 841
- Burmese calendar: −341
- Byzantine calendar: 5805–5806
- Chinese calendar: 丙辰年 (Fire Dragon); 2994 or 2787 — to — 丁巳年 (Fire Snake); 2995 or 2788
- Coptic calendar: 13–14
- Discordian calendar: 1463
- Ethiopian calendar: 289–290
- Hebrew calendar: 4057–4058
- Hindu calendars
- Vikram Samvat: 353–354
- Shaka Samvat: 218–219
- Kali Yuga: 3397–3398
- Holocene calendar: 10297
- Iranian calendar: 325 BP – 324 BP
- Islamic calendar: 335 BH – 334 BH
- Javanese calendar: 177–178
- Julian calendar: 297; CCXCVII
- Korean calendar: 2630
- Minguo calendar: 1615 before ROC 民前1615年
- Nanakshahi calendar: −1171
- Seleucid era: 608/609 AG
- Thai solar calendar: 839–840
- Tibetan calendar: མེ་ཕོ་འབྲུག་ལོ་ (male Fire-Dragon); 423 or 42 or −730 — to — མེ་མོ་སྦྲུལ་ལོ་ (female Fire-Snake); 424 or 43 or −729

Year 297 (CCXCVII) was a common year starting on Friday of the Julian calendar. At the time, it was known as the Year of the Consulship of Valerius and Valerius (or, less frequently, year 1050 Ab urbe condita). The denomination 297 for this year has been used since the early medieval period, when the Anno Domini calendar era became the prevalent method in Europe for naming years.

== Events ==
=== By place ===
==== Roman Empire ====
- Emperor Diocletian introduces a new tax system and other economic reforms.
- Diocletian watches over the Syrian provinces while Caesar Galerius makes preparations for a campaign against the Persian king Narseh. He recruits veterans from Illyria and Moesia, recruits new soldiers, and strengthens his army with Gothic mercenaries and the Armenian units of Tiridates III.
- August: Domitius Domitianus launches a usurpation against Diocletian in Egypt. He is perhaps aided by popular discontent with Diocletian's taxation reform.
- December: Domitianus dies, but his corrector Aurelius Achilleus takes over as the leader of the rebellion.
- Battle of Satala: Galerius launches a surprise attack against Narseh's camp in western Armenia. The Romans sack the camp and capture Narseh's wives, sisters and daughters, including his Queen of Queens Arsane. Narseh is wounded and escapes to his empire.

==== Egypt ====
- Autumn: Diocletian besieges the rebels in Alexandria, Egypt.

== Births ==
- Murong Huang, ruler of the Former Yan (d. 348)
- Yu Wenjun, empress of the Jin Dynasty (d. 328)

== Deaths ==
- Chen Shou, author of the San Guo Zhi (b. 233)
- Zhou Chu, Jin dynasty general, son of Zhou Fang (b. 236)
