= 220 =

220 in various calendars
- Gregorian calendar: 220; CCXX
- Ab urbe condita: 973
- Assyrian calendar: 4970
- Balinese saka calendar: 141–142
- Bengali calendar: −374 – −373
- Berber calendar: 1170
- Buddhist calendar: 764
- Burmese calendar: −418
- Byzantine calendar: 5728–5729
- Chinese calendar: 己亥年 (Earth Pig); 2917 or 2710 — to — 庚子年 (Metal Rat); 2918 or 2711
- Coptic calendar: −64 – −63
- Discordian calendar: 1386
- Ethiopian calendar: 212–213
- Hebrew calendar: 3980–3981
- Hindu calendars
- Vikram Samvat: 276–277
- Shaka Samvat: 141–142
- Kali Yuga: 3320–3321
- Holocene calendar: 10220
- Iranian calendar: 402 BP – 401 BP
- Islamic calendar: 414 BH – 413 BH
- Javanese calendar: 98–99
- Julian calendar: 220; CCXX
- Korean calendar: 2553
- Minguo calendar: 1692 before ROC 民前1692年
- Nanakshahi calendar: −1248
- Seleucid era: 531/532 AG
- Thai solar calendar: 762–763
- Tibetan calendar: ས་མོ་ཕག་ལོ་ (female Earth-Boar); 346 or −35 or −807 — to — ལྕགས་ཕོ་བྱི་བ་ལོ་ (male Iron-Rat); 347 or −34 or −806

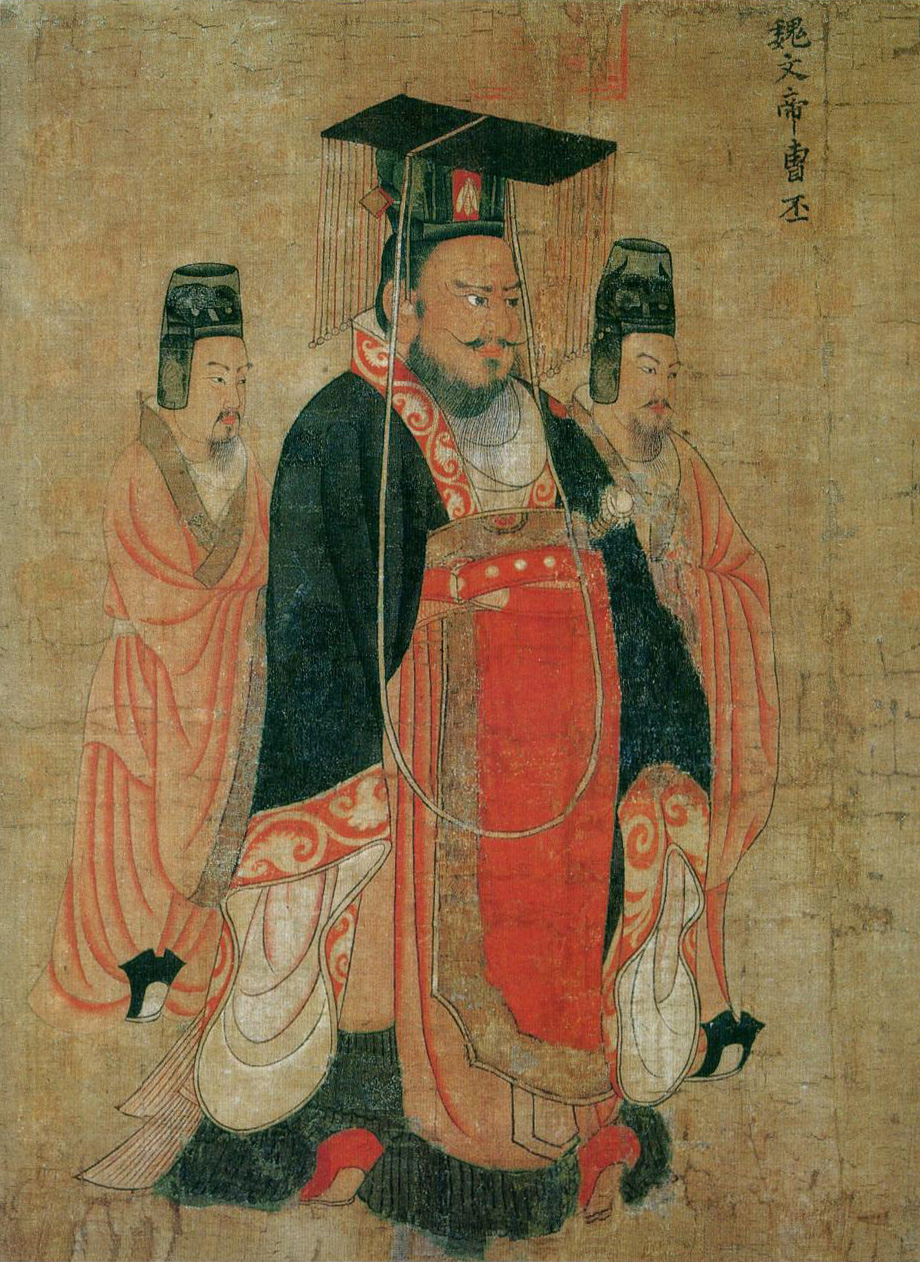
Emperor Cao Pi and his ministers

Year 220 (CCXX) was a leap year starting on Saturday of the Julian calendar. At the time, it was known as the Year of the Consulship of Antonius and Eutychianus (or, less frequently, year 973 Ab urbe condita). The denomination 220 for this year has been used since the early medieval period, when the Anno Domini calendar era became the prevalent method in Europe for naming years.

== Events ==
=== By place ===
==== Roman Empire ====
- The Goths invade Asia Minor and the Balkans.
- An Indian delegation visits the Roman emperor Elagabalus.
- Great frost in Roman Britain is said to have lasted for five months.
- Imperator Marcus Aurelius Antoninus Augustus (Elagabalus) and Publius Valerius Comazon become Roman consuls.
- Elagabalus divorces Julia Paula and marries Aquilia Severa, a Vestal Virgin. The wedding causes an enormous controversy – traditionally, the punishment for breaking celibacy is death by being buried alive.

==== Parthian Empire ====
- King Ardashir I, founder of the Sassanid dynasty, gains support from some Parthian sub-kings and revolts against the rule of Vologases VI. Ardashir, a grandson of Sasan, had ruled Persis since 208 and six years earlier gained control of the region surrounding Persepolis.

==== China ====
- March 15 – Cao Cao, Imperial Chancellor and ruler of the Kingdom of Wei, dies.
- December 11 – Cao Pi receives the abdication of Emperor Xian of Han and proclaims himself emperor of Cao Wei. This ends the Han dynasty, the former emperor being created Duke of Shanyang.

=== By topic ===
==== Religion ====
- The Wei dynasty gives official recognition to Taoism as its religious sect, and the sect's celestial masters reciprocate, by giving spiritual approbation to the Wei as successors to the Han. By the end of the century, most powerful families in northern China have subscribed to Daoist principles.

== Births ==
- Wei Guan, Chinese official of the Cao Wei state and the Western Jin dynasty (d. 291)

== Deaths ==
- March 15 – Cao Cao, Chinese warlord of the Eastern Han dynasty (b. 155)
- June 13 – Xiahou Dun, Chinese general serving under the Eastern Han dynasty warlord Cao Cao
- December – Cheng Yu, Chinese official serving under the Eastern Han dynasty warlord Cao Cao (b. 141)
- Fa Zheng, Chinese official serving under the Eastern Han dynasty warlord Liu Bei (b. 176)
- Guan Yu, Chinese general serving under the Eastern Han dynasty warlord Liu Bei
- Guan Ping, son of Guan Yu
- Huang Zhong, Chinese general serving under the Eastern Han dynasty warlord Liu Bei
- Lü Meng, Chinese general serving under the Eastern Han dynasty warlord Sun Quan (b. 178)
- Bassilla, Roman actress, dancer and singer (approximate year)
- Tertullian, first Christian author to produce an extensive corpus of Latin Christian literature (b. 155)
