= 169 =

169 may refer to:

- 169 BC
- AD 169
- 169 (number), the natural number following 168 and preceding 170
- UFC 169
- 169 Zelia
- NGC 169
- 169 series
- Radical 169
- Bundesstraße 169
- Interstate 169 (disambiguation)
