= Zhao Qi (Han dynasty) =

Eastern Han dynasty official and scholar (died 201)

- 趙岐

Minister of Ceremonies (太常)
- In office ? – 201
- Monarch: Emperor Xian of Han

Minister Coachman (太僕)
- In office 192 – ?
- Monarch: Emperor Xian of Han

Consultant (議郎)
- In office 191 – 192
- Monarch: Emperor Xian of Han
- Chancellor: Dong Zhuo

Personal details
- Born: 100s Xi'an, Shaanxi
- Died: 201 (aged 90+)
- Spouse: Ma Rong's niece
- Relations: Zhao Pan (brother); Zhao Wuji (brother); Zhao Xi (cousin)
- Occupation: Official, scholar
- Courtesy name: Binqing (邠卿); Taiqing (臺卿) (original)
- Original name: Zhao Jia (趙嘉)

Zhao Qi (100s-201), courtesy name Binqing, was an official and scholar who lived during the Eastern Han dynasty of China. He wrote the Commentaries on Mencius (孟子章句), one of the few major commentaries on Mencius from that period still in existence.

== See also ==
- Lists of people of the Three Kingdoms
