= 200s =

200s may refer to:

- The period from 200 to 299, almost synonymous with the 3rd century (201–300)
- The period from 200 to 209, known as the 200s (decade) almost synonymous with the 21st decade (201-210)
- Chrysler 200S, a trim of the Chrysler 200 car
