= 234 BC =

234 BC in various calendars
Gregorian calendar	234 BC; CCXXXIV BC
Ab urbe condita	520
Ancient Egypt era	XXXIII dynasty, 90
Pharaoh	Ptolemy III Euergetes, 13
Ancient Greek Olympiad (summer)	136th Olympiad, year 3
Assyrian calendar	4517
Balinese saka calendar	N/A
Bengali calendar	−827 – −826
Berber calendar	717
Buddhist calendar	311
Burmese calendar	−871
Byzantine calendar	5275–5276
Chinese calendar	丙寅年 (Fire Tiger); 2464 or 2257 — to — 丁卯年 (Fire Rabbit); 2465 or 2258
Coptic calendar	−517 – −516
Discordian calendar	933
Ethiopian calendar	−241 – −240
Hebrew calendar	3527–3528
- Hindu calendars
Vikram Samvat	−177 – −176
Shaka Samvat	N/A
Kali Yuga	2867–2868
Holocene calendar	9767
Iranian calendar	855 BP – 854 BP
Islamic calendar	881 BH – 880 BH
Javanese calendar	N/A
Julian calendar	N/A
Korean calendar	2100
Minguo calendar	2145 before ROC 民前2145年
Nanakshahi calendar	−1701
Seleucid era	78/79 AG
Thai solar calendar	309–310
Tibetan calendar	阳火虎年 (male Fire-Tiger) −107 or −488 or −1260 — to — 阴火兔年 (female Fire-Rabbit) −106 or −487 or −1259

Year 234 BC was a year of the pre-Julian Roman calendar. At the time it was known as the Year of the Consulship of Albinus and Ruga (or, less frequently, year 520 Ab urbe condita). The denomination 234 BC for this year has been used since the early medieval period, when the Anno Domini calendar era became the prevalent method in Europe for naming years.

== Events ==
=== By place ===
==== Greece ====
- The Epirote Alliance is replaced by the Epirote League, which is a federal state with its own parliament (or synedrion).
- The city of Pleuron is destroyed by Demetrius II of Macedon.
- After the resignation of Lydiadas, the city of Megalopolis joins the Achaean League.

==== Roman Republic ====
- Corsica, Sardinia and Liguria rebel unsuccessfully against Rome.

==== China ====
- The Qin general Huan Yi wins a major victory over the Zhao general Hu Zhe in the Battle of Pingyang, and captures Pingyang and Wucheng.

== Births ==
- Marcus Porcius Cato (Cato the Elder), Roman statesman, (d. 149 BC)
- Mete Khan, Xiongnu emperor, (d. 174 BC)

== Deaths ==
- Pharnavaz I of Iberia, King of Georgia
- Zenodotus of Ephesus, first librarian of the Library of Alexandria
