= AD 164 =

164 in various calendars
- Gregorian calendar: 164; CLXIV
- Ab urbe condita: 917
- Assyrian calendar: 4914
- Balinese saka calendar: 85–86
- Bengali calendar: −430 – −429
- Berber calendar: 1114
- Buddhist calendar: 708
- Burmese calendar: −474
- Byzantine calendar: 5672–5673
- Chinese calendar: 癸卯年 (Water Rabbit); 2861 or 2654 — to — 甲辰年 (Wood Dragon); 2862 or 2655
- Coptic calendar: −120 – −119
- Discordian calendar: 1330
- Ethiopian calendar: 156–157
- Hebrew calendar: 3924–3925
- Hindu calendars
- Vikram Samvat: 220–221
- Shaka Samvat: 85–86
- Kali Yuga: 3264–3265
- Holocene calendar: 10164
- Iranian calendar: 458 BP – 457 BP
- Islamic calendar: 472 BH – 471 BH
- Javanese calendar: 40–41
- Julian calendar: 164; CLXIV
- Korean calendar: 2497
- Minguo calendar: 1748 before ROC 民前1748年
- Nanakshahi calendar: −1304
- Seleucid era: 475/476 AG
- Thai solar calendar: 706–707
- Tibetan calendar: ཆུ་མོ་ཡོས་ལོ་ (female Water-Hare); 290 or −91 or −863 — to — ཤིང་ཕོ་འབྲུག་ལོ་ (male Wood-Dragon); 291 or −90 or −862

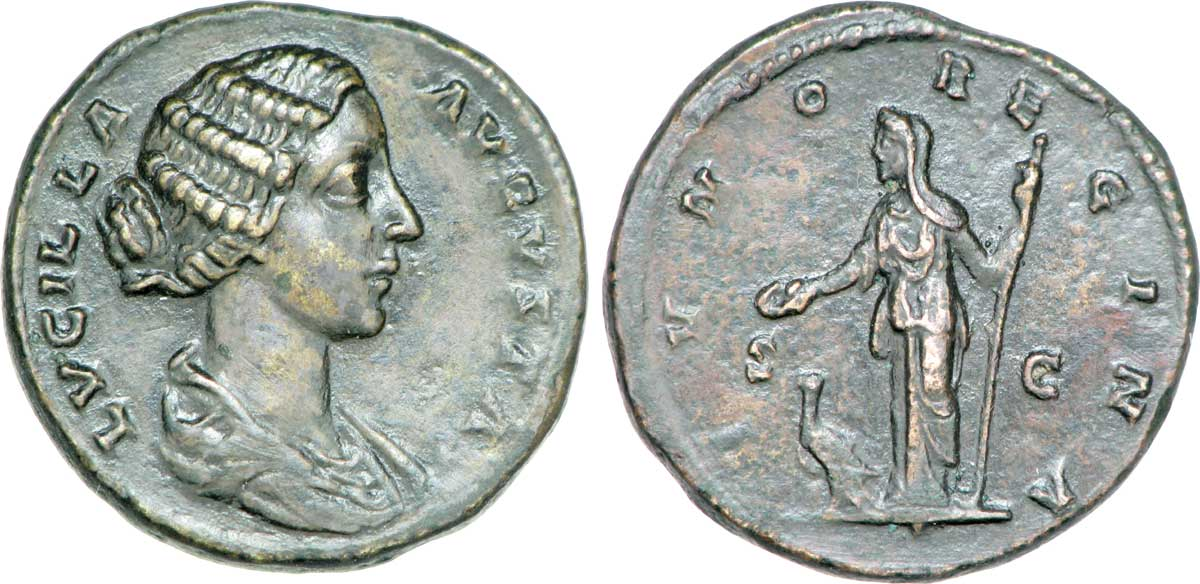
Dupondius depicting Lucilla Augusta

Year 164 (CLXIV) was a leap year starting on Saturday of the Julian calendar. At the time, it was known as the Year of the Consulship of Macrinus and Celsus (or, less frequently, year 917 Ab urbe condita). The denomination 164 for this year has been used since the early medieval period, when the Anno Domini calendar era became the prevalent method in Europe for naming years.

== Events ==
=== By place ===
==== Roman Empire ====
- Emperor Marcus Aurelius gives his daughter Lucilla in marriage to his co-emperor Lucius Verus.
- Avidius Cassius, one of Lucius Verus' generals, crosses the Euphrates and invades Parthia.
- Ctesiphon is captured by the Romans, but returns to the Parthians after the end of the war.
- The Antonine Wall in Scotland is abandoned by the Romans.
- Seleucia on the Tigris is destroyed.

== Births ==
- Bruttia Crispina, Roman empress (d. 191)
- Ge Xuan (or Xiaoxian), Chinese Taoist (d. 244)
- Yu Fan, Chinese scholar and official (d. 233)
