= AD 185 =

185 in various calendars
- Gregorian calendar: 185; CLXXXV
- Ab urbe condita: 938
- Assyrian calendar: 4935
- Balinese saka calendar: 106–107
- Bengali calendar: −409 – −408
- Berber calendar: 1135
- Buddhist calendar: 729
- Burmese calendar: −453
- Byzantine calendar: 5693–5694
- Chinese calendar: 甲子年 (Wood Rat); 2882 or 2675 — to — 乙丑年 (Wood Ox); 2883 or 2676
- Coptic calendar: −99 – −98
- Discordian calendar: 1351
- Ethiopian calendar: 177–178
- Hebrew calendar: 3945–3946
- Hindu calendars
- Vikram Samvat: 241–242
- Shaka Samvat: 106–107
- Kali Yuga: 3285–3286
- Holocene calendar: 10185
- Iranian calendar: 437 BP – 436 BP
- Islamic calendar: 450 BH – 449 BH
- Javanese calendar: 61–62
- Julian calendar: 185; CLXXXV
- Korean calendar: 2518
- Minguo calendar: 1727 before ROC 民前1727年
- Nanakshahi calendar: −1283
- Seleucid era: 496/497 AG
- Thai solar calendar: 727–728
- Tibetan calendar: ཤིང་ཕོ་བྱི་བ་ལོ་ (male Wood-Rat); 311 or −70 or −842 — to — ཤིང་མོ་གླང་ལོ་ (female Wood-Ox); 312 or −69 or −841

Year 185 (CLXXXV) was a common year starting on Friday of the Julian calendar. At the time, it was known as the Year of the Consulship of Lascivius and Atilius (or, less frequently, year 938 Ab urbe condita). The denomination 185 for this year has been used since the early medieval period, when the Anno Domini calendar era became the prevalent method in Europe for naming years.

== Events ==
=== By place ===
==== Roman Empire ====
- Nobles of Britain demand that Emperor Commodus rescind all power given to Tigidius Perennis, who is eventually executed.
- Publius Helvius Pertinax is made governor of Britain and quells a mutiny of the British Roman legions who wanted him to become emperor. The disgruntled usurpers go on to attempt to assassinate the governor.
- Tigidius Perennis, his family and many others are executed for conspiring against Commodus.
- Commodus drains Rome's treasury to put on gladiatorial spectacles and confiscates property to support his pleasures. He participates as a gladiator and boasts of victory in 1,000 matches in the Circus Maximus.

==== China ====
- Zhi Yao, a Kushan Buddhist monk of Yuezhi ethnicity, translates Buddhist texts into the Chinese language during the Han dynasty.
- February – The rebels of the Yellow Turban are defeated by the imperial army, but only two months later, the rebellion breaks out again. It spreads to the Taihang Mountains on the western border of Hebei Province.

=== By topic ===
==== Art and Science ====
- Cleomedes discovers the refraction of light by the Earth's atmosphere.
- A supernova now known as SN 185 is noted by Chinese astronomers in the Astrological Annals of the Houhanshu, making it the earliest recorded supernova.

==== Religion ====
- Irenaeus writes that there are only four Gospels (approximate date).

== Births ==
- Liu Ji (or Jingyu), Chinese official and minister (d. 233)
- Origen, Christian scholar and theologian (approximate date)
- Wang Xiang, Chinese minister of the Cao Wei state (d. 269)

== Deaths ==
- April 21 – Apollonius the Apologist, Christian apologist
- Pharasmanes III (or P'arsman), Georgian king of Iberia
- Tigidius Perennis, Roman praetorian prefect (executed)
