= 149 BC =

149 BC in various calendars
- Gregorian calendar: 149 BC; CXLIX BC
- Ab urbe condita: 605
- Ancient Egypt era: XXXIII dynasty, 175
- Pharaoh: Ptolemy VI Philometor, 32
- Ancient Greek Olympiad (summer): 157th Olympiad, year 4
- Assyrian calendar: 4602
- Balinese saka calendar: N/A
- Bengali calendar: −742 – −741
- Berber calendar: 802
- Buddhist calendar: 396
- Burmese calendar: −786
- Byzantine calendar: 5360–5361
- Chinese calendar: 辛卯年 (Metal Rabbit); 2549 or 2342 — to — 壬辰年 (Water Dragon); 2550 or 2343
- Coptic calendar: −432 – −431
- Discordian calendar: 1018
- Ethiopian calendar: −156 – −155
- Hebrew calendar: 3612–3613
- Hindu calendars
- Vikram Samvat: −92 – −91
- Shaka Samvat: N/A
- Kali Yuga: 2952–2953
- Holocene calendar: 9852
- Iranian calendar: 770 BP – 769 BP
- Islamic calendar: 794 BH – 793 BH
- Javanese calendar: N/A
- Julian calendar: N/A
- Korean calendar: 2185
- Minguo calendar: 2060 before ROC 民前2060年
- Nanakshahi calendar: −1616
- Seleucid era: 163/164 AG
- Thai solar calendar: 394–395
- Tibetan calendar: ལྕགས་མོ་ཡོས་ལོ་ (female Iron-Hare) −22 or −403 or −1175 — to — ཆུ་ཕོ་འབྲུག་ལོ་ (male Water-Dragon) −21 or −402 or −1174

Year 149 BC was a year of the pre-Julian Roman calendar. At the time it was known as the Year of the Consulship of Censorinus and Manilius (or, less frequently, year 605 Ab urbe condita). The denomination 149 BC for this year has been used since the early medieval period, when the Anno Domini calendar era became the prevalent method in Europe for naming years.

== Events ==
=== By place ===
==== Roman Republic ====
- The Third Punic War begins. The Romans land an army in Africa to begin the Battle of Carthage.
- Servius Sulpicius Galba is prosecuted for corruption while serving in Spain, but is acquitted after he parades his weeping family members before the tribunal.
- Lucius Calpurnius Piso passes the Lex Calpurnia de repetundis which establishes the first permanent criminal court in Rome.
- The turmoil in Spain escalates again with the renewal of the Lusitanian War, under the leadership of Viriathus, and the Celtiberian War.

==== Macedon ====
- Andriscus, the last king of Macedon, ascends to the throne.

==== Bithynia ====
- With Roman help, Nicomedes II overthrows his father Prusias II as king of Bithynia.

== Deaths ==
- Cato the Elder, Roman statesman (b. 234 BC)
- Prusias II, Greek king of Bithynia (b. c. 220 BC)
