= AD 168 =

168 in various calendars
- Gregorian calendar: 168; CLXVIII
- Ab urbe condita: 921
- Assyrian calendar: 4918
- Balinese saka calendar: 89–90
- Bengali calendar: −426 – −425
- Berber calendar: 1118
- Buddhist calendar: 712
- Burmese calendar: −470
- Byzantine calendar: 5676–5677
- Chinese calendar: 丁未年 (Fire Goat); 2865 or 2658 — to — 戊申年 (Earth Monkey); 2866 or 2659
- Coptic calendar: −116 – −115
- Discordian calendar: 1334
- Ethiopian calendar: 160–161
- Hebrew calendar: 3928–3929
- Hindu calendars
- Vikram Samvat: 224–225
- Shaka Samvat: 89–90
- Kali Yuga: 3268–3269
- Holocene calendar: 10168
- Iranian calendar: 454 BP – 453 BP
- Islamic calendar: 468 BH – 467 BH
- Javanese calendar: 44–45
- Julian calendar: 168; CLXVIII
- Korean calendar: 2501
- Minguo calendar: 1744 before ROC 民前1744年
- Nanakshahi calendar: −1300
- Seleucid era: 479/480 AG
- Thai solar calendar: 710–711
- Tibetan calendar: མེ་མོ་ལུག་ལོ་ (female Fire-Sheep); 294 or −87 or −859 — to — ས་ཕོ་སྤྲེ་ལོ་ (male Earth-Monkey); 295 or −86 or −858

Year 168 (CLXVIII) was a leap year starting on Thursday of the Julian calendar. At the time, it was known as the Year of the Consulship of Apronianus and Paullus (or, less frequently, year 921 Ab urbe condita). The denomination 168 for this year has been used since the early medieval period, when the Anno Domini calendar era became the prevalent method in Europe for naming years.

== Events ==
=== By place ===
==== Roman Empire ====
- Emperor Marcus Aurelius and his adopted brother Lucius Verus leave Rome, and establish their headquarters at Aquileia.
- The Roman army crosses the Alps into Pannonia, and subdues the Marcomanni at Carnuntum, north of the Danube.

==== Asia ====
- Emperor Ling of Han succeeds Emperor Huan of Han as the emperor of the Chinese Han dynasty; the first year of the Jianning era.

== Births ==
- Cao Ren, Chinese general (d. 223)
- Gu Yong, Chinese chancellor (d. 243)
- Li Tong, Chinese general (d. 209)

== Deaths ==
- Anicetus, pope of Rome (approximate date)
- Chen Fan, Chinese official and politician
- Daniel of Padua, Italian bishop and saint
- Dou Wu, Chinese politician and regent
- Huan of Han, Chinese emperor (b. 132)
- Titus Flavius Boethus, Roman politician
- Titus Furius Victorinus, Roman prefect
