= 233 =

233 in various calendars
- Gregorian calendar: 233; CCXXXIII
- Ab urbe condita: 986
- Assyrian calendar: 4983
- Balinese saka calendar: 154–155
- Bengali calendar: −361 – −360
- Berber calendar: 1183
- Buddhist calendar: 777
- Burmese calendar: −405
- Byzantine calendar: 5741–5742
- Chinese calendar: 壬子年 (Water Rat); 2930 or 2723 — to — 癸丑年 (Water Ox); 2931 or 2724
- Coptic calendar: −51 – −50
- Discordian calendar: 1399
- Ethiopian calendar: 225–226
- Hebrew calendar: 3993–3994
- Hindu calendars
- Vikram Samvat: 289–290
- Shaka Samvat: 154–155
- Kali Yuga: 3333–3334
- Holocene calendar: 10233
- Iranian calendar: 389 BP – 388 BP
- Islamic calendar: 401 BH – 400 BH
- Javanese calendar: 111–112
- Julian calendar: 233; CCXXXIII
- Korean calendar: 2566
- Minguo calendar: 1679 before ROC 民前1679年
- Nanakshahi calendar: −1235
- Seleucid era: 544/545 AG
- Thai solar calendar: 775–776
- Tibetan calendar: ཆུ་ཕོ་བྱི་བ་ལོ་ (male Water-Rat); 359 or −22 or −794 — to — ཆུ་མོ་གླང་ལོ་ (female Water-Ox); 360 or −21 or −793

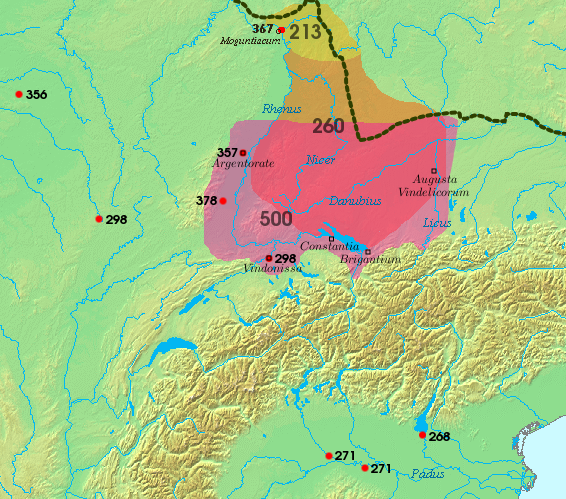
Alemanni expansion (3rd century)

Year 233 (CCXXXIII) was a common year starting on Tuesday of the Julian calendar. At the time, it was known as the Year of the Consulship of Claudius and Paternus (or, less frequently, year 986 Ab urbe condita). The denomination 233 for this year has been used since the early medieval period, when the Anno Domini calendar era became the prevalent method in Europe for naming years.

== Events ==
=== By place ===
==== Roman Empire ====
- Emperor Alexander Severus celebrates a triumph in Rome to observe his "victory" the previous year over the Persians (in reality, Severus Alexander advanced towards Ctesiphon in 233, but as corroborated by Herodian, his armies suffered a humiliating defeat against Ardashir I). He is soon summoned to the Rhine frontier, where the Alamanni invade what is now modern-day Swabia. German tribes destroy Roman forts, and plunder the countryside at the Limes Germanicus.

== Births ==
- Chen Shou, Chinese historian and writer of the Records of the Three Kingdoms (d. 297)

== Deaths ==
- June 13 – Cao Rui, Chinese imperial prince of the Cao Wei state
- Liu Ji, Chinese official and politician of the Eastern Wu state (b. 185)
- Yu Fan, Chinese official and politician of the Eastern Wu state (b. 164)
