= AD 191 =

191 in various calendars
- Gregorian calendar: 191; CXCI
- Ab urbe condita: 944
- Assyrian calendar: 4941
- Balinese saka calendar: 112–113
- Bengali calendar: −403 – −402
- Berber calendar: 1141
- Buddhist calendar: 735
- Burmese calendar: −447
- Byzantine calendar: 5699–5700
- Chinese calendar: 庚午年 (Metal Horse); 2888 or 2681 — to — 辛未年 (Metal Goat); 2889 or 2682
- Coptic calendar: −93 – −92
- Discordian calendar: 1357
- Ethiopian calendar: 183–184
- Hebrew calendar: 3951–3952
- Hindu calendars
- Vikram Samvat: 247–248
- Shaka Samvat: 112–113
- Kali Yuga: 3291–3292
- Holocene calendar: 10191
- Iranian calendar: 431 BP – 430 BP
- Islamic calendar: 444 BH – 443 BH
- Javanese calendar: 68–69
- Julian calendar: 191; CXCI
- Korean calendar: 2524
- Minguo calendar: 1721 before ROC 民前1721年
- Nanakshahi calendar: −1277
- Seleucid era: 502/503 AG
- Thai solar calendar: 733–734
- Tibetan calendar: ལྕགས་ཕོ་རྟ་ལོ་ (male Iron-Horse); 317 or −64 or −836 — to — ལྕགས་མོ་ལུག་ལོ་ (female Iron-Sheep); 318 or −63 or −835

Year 191 (CXCI) was a common year starting on Friday of the Julian calendar. The denomination 191 for this year has been used since the early medieval period, when the Anno Domini calendar era became the prevalent method in Europe for naming years.

== Events ==
=== By place ===
==== Parthia ====
- King Vologases IV of Parthia dies after a 44-year reign, and is succeeded by his son Vologases V.

==== China ====
- A coalition of Chinese warlords from the east of Hangu Pass launches a punitive campaign against the warlord Dong Zhuo, who seized control of the central government in 189, and held the figurehead Emperor Xian hostage. After suffering some defeats against the coalition forces, Dong Zhuo forcefully relocates the imperial capital from Luoyang to Chang'an. Before leaving, Dong Zhuo orders his troops to loot the tombs of the Han emperors, and then destroy Luoyang by fire, to leave behind nothing for the coalition.
- Battle of Jieqiao: Yuan Shao narrowly defeats Gongsun Zan, in northern China.

=== By topic ===
==== Art ====
- c. 191–192 – The sculpture of Commodus as Hercules, from Esquiline Hill, Rome, is made (it is now kept at Palazzo dei Conservatori, Rome).

==== Religion ====
- Serapion becomes Patriarch of Antioch.

== Births ==
- Xin Xianying, Chinese noblewoman and advisor (d. 269).

== Deaths ==
- Bruttia Crispina, Roman empress (executed) (b. 164)
- Han Fu, Chinese governor and warlord
- Hua Xiong, Chinese general (executed)
- Qiao Mao, Chinese official and warlord
- Sun Jian, Chinese general and warlord (b. 155)
- Vologases IV, king of the Parthian Empire
- Zhang Wen, Chinese official and general
