= AD 155 =

155 in various calendars
- Gregorian calendar: 155; CLV
- Ab urbe condita: 908
- Assyrian calendar: 4905
- Balinese saka calendar: 76–77
- Bengali calendar: −439 – −438
- Berber calendar: 1105
- Buddhist calendar: 699
- Burmese calendar: −483
- Byzantine calendar: 5663–5664
- Chinese calendar: 甲午年 (Wood Horse); 2852 or 2645 — to — 乙未年 (Wood Goat); 2853 or 2646
- Coptic calendar: −129 – −128
- Discordian calendar: 1321
- Ethiopian calendar: 147–148
- Hebrew calendar: 3915–3916
- Hindu calendars
- Vikram Samvat: 211–212
- Shaka Samvat: 76–77
- Kali Yuga: 3255–3256
- Holocene calendar: 10155
- Iranian calendar: 467 BP – 466 BP
- Islamic calendar: 481 BH – 480 BH
- Javanese calendar: 31–32
- Julian calendar: 155; CLV
- Korean calendar: 2488
- Minguo calendar: 1757 before ROC 民前1757年
- Nanakshahi calendar: −1313
- Seleucid era: 466/467 AG
- Thai solar calendar: 697–698
- Tibetan calendar: ཤིང་ཕོ་རྟ་ལོ་ (male Wood-Horse); 281 or −100 or −872 — to — ཤིང་མོ་ལུག་ལོ་ (female Wood-Sheep); 282 or −99 or −871

Year 155 (CLV) was a common year starting on Tuesday of the Julian calendar. At the time, it was known as the Year of the Consulship of Severus and Rufinus (or, less frequently, year 908 Ab urbe condita). The denomination 155 for this year has been used since the early medieval period, when the Anno Domini calendar era became the prevalent method in Europe for naming years.

== Events ==
- The Council of Rome, a pre-ecumenical church council, is held and presided over by Bishop of Rome Anicetus.

== Births ==
- Cao Cao, Chinese statesman and warlord (d. 220)
- Dio Cassius, Roman historian (d. c. 235)
- Tertullian, Roman Christian theologian (d. c. 240)
- Sun Jian, Chinese general and warlord (d. 191)

== Deaths ==
- Pius I, Roman bishop
- Polycarp, bishop of Smyrna (b. AD 65)
