= Namur 174 =

Namur 174 may refer to one of two adjacent Indian reserves northwest of Fort McMurray in Alberta, Canada, both owned by the Fort McKay First Nation:

- Namur River 174A, to the northeast
- Namur Lake 174B, to the southwest
