= Lectionary 174 =

Lectionary ℓ 174
- New Testament manuscript
- Text: Apostolarion
- Date: 13th century
- Script: Greek
- Now at: National Library of Russia
- Size: 10.2 by 7.2 cm

Lectionary 174, designated by siglum ℓ 174 (in the Gregory-Aland numbering) is a Greek manuscript of the New Testament on parchment. Paleographically, it has been assigned to the 13th century. Formerly it was labelled as Lectionary 72^{a} (11 leaves) and 74^{a} (1 leaf).

== Description ==
The codex contains Lessons from the Acts and Epistles lectionary (Apostolarion) on 32 parchment leaves (10.2 cm by 7.2 cm), with numerous lacunae. The text is written in Greek minuscule letters in one column per page with 10 lines per page. It is a palimpsest; the lower text is in Arabic.

== History ==
The manuscript was examined by Constantin von Tischendorf (1 leaf) and Gregory.

The manuscript is sporadically cited in the critical editions of the Greek New Testament (UBS3).

Currently, the codex is located in the National Library of Russia (Gr. 37, fol. 2.3; Gr. 37a; Gr. 45a; Gr. 110; Gr. 112) at Saint Petersburg.

== See also ==
- List of New Testament lectionaries
- Biblical manuscript
- Textual criticism

== Bibliography ==
- C. von Tischendorf, Anecdota sacra et profana, p. 11, Nr. XIII 4 and 5.
