= Interstate 169 =

Interstate 169 may refer to any of four currently designated or future highways which are or would be auxiliary routes of Interstate 69,

== Currently designated ==
- Interstate 169 (Kentucky), a highway along the former Pennyrile Parkway in Kentucky
- Interstate 169 (Texas), a partially complete highway under construction near Brownsville, Texas

== Future ==
- Interstate 169 (Tennessee), a highway proposed between Martin and Union City, Tennessee
