= 155 (Wessex) Transport Regiment (Volunteers) =

- Active: 1967–1993; 2006–2014
- Country: United Kingdom
- Branch: British Army
- Type: Regiment
- Role: Logistics
- Part of: Royal Logistic Corps

155 (Wessex) Transport Regiment, Royal Logistic Corps, was a regiment in the United Kingdom's Territorial Army that was initially formed in 1967 and disbanded in 2014.

== History ==
The regiment was first formed in the Royal Corps of Transport as 155th (Wessex) Regiment, RCT (Volunteers) in 1967. It was disbanded in 1993 but re-formed in the Royal Logistic Corps as 155th (Wessex) Transport Regiment, RLC (Volunteers) in 2006. It disbanded under Army 2020, with 232 Transport Squadron re-roling to a Port Squadron and then moving to 165 Port and Maritime Regiment RLC.

== Structure ==
The final structure was as follows:

- 241 HQ Squadron
- 232 Squadron
- 233 Squadron
- 245 Squadron
