= 187 =

187 may also refer to:

== Entertainment ==
- One Eight Seven, a 1997 American crime thriller film released by Warner Bros.

== Music ==
- Deep Cover (song), also known as 187 and 187um, a 1992 song by Dr. Dre and Snoop Doggy Dogg from the American action thriller film Deep Cover
- 187, a 1998 album by 187 Lockdown
- 187, a 2012 mixtape by Tyga

== Sports ==
- 187 (professional wrestling), a wrestling act

== Other uses ==
- 187 (number)
- 187 (slang), a slang of the California Penal Code that defines the crime of murder
- 187 BC, a year from the Roman calendar
- AD 187
- 187, a character in the film Dracula 3000
- 187 Lamberta, a main-belt asteroid
