= AD 147 =

147 in various calendars
- Gregorian calendar: 147; CXLVII
- Ab urbe condita: 900
- Assyrian calendar: 4897
- Balinese saka calendar: 68–69
- Bengali calendar: −447 – −446
- Berber calendar: 1097
- Buddhist calendar: 691
- Burmese calendar: −491
- Byzantine calendar: 5655–5656
- Chinese calendar: 丙戌年 (Fire Dog); 2844 or 2637 — to — 丁亥年 (Fire Pig); 2845 or 2638
- Coptic calendar: −137 – −136
- Discordian calendar: 1313
- Ethiopian calendar: 139–140
- Hebrew calendar: 3907–3908
- Hindu calendars
- Vikram Samvat: 203–204
- Shaka Samvat: 68–69
- Kali Yuga: 3247–3248
- Holocene calendar: 10147
- Iranian calendar: 475 BP – 474 BP
- Islamic calendar: 490 BH – 489 BH
- Javanese calendar: 22–23
- Julian calendar: 147; CXLVII
- Korean calendar: 2480
- Minguo calendar: 1765 before ROC 民前1765年
- Nanakshahi calendar: −1321
- Seleucid era: 458/459 AG
- Thai solar calendar: 689–690
- Tibetan calendar: མེ་ཕོ་ཁྱི་ལོ་ (male Fire-Dog); 273 or −108 or −880 — to — མེ་མོ་ཕག་ལོ་ (female Fire-Boar); 274 or −107 or −879

Year 147 (CXLVII) was a common year starting on Saturday of the Julian calendar. At the time, it was known as the Year of the Consulship of Messalinus and Largus (or, less frequently, year 900 Ab urbe condita). The denomination 147 for this year has been used since the early medieval period, when the Anno Domini calendar era became the prevalent method in Europe for naming years.

== Events ==
=== By place ===
==== Roman Empire ====
- Marcus Aurelius receives imperial powers, from Emperor Antoninus Pius.
- Festivals to celebrate the 900th anniversary of the founding of Rome begin.

==== Parthian Empire ====
- King Vologases III dies after a 42-year reign, in which he has contended successfully with his rivals.
- King Vologases IV, son of Mithridates V of Parthia, unites the Parthian Empire under his rule.

==== Asia ====
- First year of Jianhe of the Chinese Han dynasty.

== Births ==
- Annia Galeria Aurelia Faustina, daughter of Marcus Aurelius (approximate date)
- Jia Xu (or Wenhe), Chinese official and adviser (d. 223)
- Lokaksema, Kushan Buddhist monk and traveler (d. 189)

== Deaths ==
- Li Gu, Chinese scholar and official (b. AD 93)
- Vologases III, king of the Parthian Empire
- Xu Shen, Chinese politician and writer (b. AD 58)
