= NGC 169 =

Spiral galaxy in Andromeda

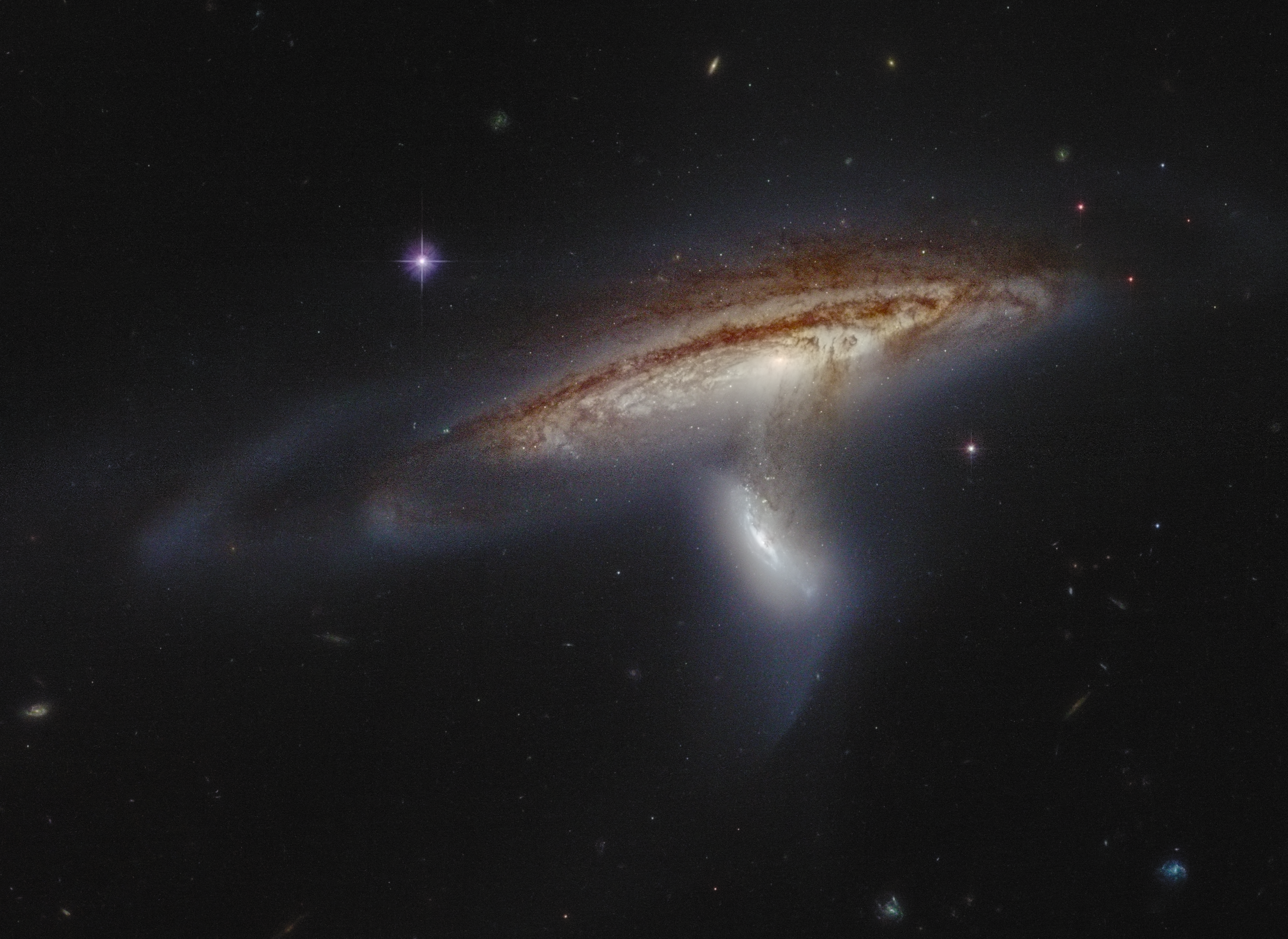
- Hubble Space Telescope/Víctor M. Blanco Telescope image of NGC 169 (top) and IC 1559 (bottom)

Observation data (J2000 epoch)
- Constellation: Andromeda
- Right ascension: 00^{h} 36^{m} 51.6^{s}
- Declination: +23° 59′ 27″
- Redshift: 0.015434
- Apparent magnitude (V): 13.3

Characteristics
- Type: SA(s)ab
- Apparent size (V): 2.6' × 0.7'

Other designations
- UGC 365, PGC 2202, Arp 282

NGC 169 is an unbarred spiral galaxy located in the constellation Andromeda. It was discovered on September 18, 1857, by R. J. Mitchell.

NGC 169 has a smaller companion named NGC 169A, also designated IC1559. The two are currently interacting, and the pair is included in Halton Arp's Atlas of Peculiar Galaxies.
