= Xing Rongjie =

Military leader

Xing Rongjie (Chinese: 邢荣杰; pinyin: Xing Rongjie; 1911 – 20 November 1997) was a Chinese military officer. He was the army Founding General in China.

== Early life ==
Xing was born in Wuji County in Heibei, China, in 1911. He started his career in the army in 1933 as a Mission Commander of the Defend Group, and joined the Chinese Republic Army in 1937.

== Roles in Army ==
During the Second Sino-Japanese War, Xing served in the following capacities:

- worked as the Captain of Ji West Guerrillas
- served as Command Chief of Staff and Commander of the Third Detachment, Yu Ji.
- Chief of Staff of the Anti-Japanese Volunteer Army, Taihang Fifth Military Region
- Chief of Staff of the military subdistrict 34
- Chief of staff of the 8th Military Subdistrict

During the war of liberation, Xing served in the following capacities:

- District Chief of Staff of the Fifth Military Region of Daheng
- Chief of Staff of the Sixth Column 16 Jinjilushu Field Army Brigade
- Captain of Central Plains Area Military University
- Commander of the 36th Division.

After the founding of the People's Republic of China, Xing:

- Became the Commander of the 3rd Corps
- Commander of the military subdistrict of East Sichuan Fuling Military Region
- Professor tactical trainers and Deputy Director of the Training Department of the Nanjing Military Academy
- Military attaché of Socialist Republic of Vietnam Embassy
- Commander of Shaanxi Military District

In 1964, Xing was promoted to the rank of major general. This was the first group of generals in China. He was listed one of the founding generals in China.

During his career, Xing was awarded the Medal of Freedom of Independent, and the Independent Liberation Medal.
