= 176 =

176 may refer to:

- 176 BC
- AD 176
- 176 (number), the natural number following 175 and preceding 177
- 176 Iduna
- UFC 176
- Heinkel He 176
- Interstate 176
- Gliese 176
