= 269 =

269 in various calendars
- Gregorian calendar: 269; CCLXIX
- Ab urbe condita: 1022
- Assyrian calendar: 5019
- Balinese saka calendar: 190–191
- Bengali calendar: −325 – −324
- Berber calendar: 1219
- Buddhist calendar: 813
- Burmese calendar: −369
- Byzantine calendar: 5777–5778
- Chinese calendar: 戊子年 (Earth Rat); 2966 or 2759 — to — 己丑年 (Earth Ox); 2967 or 2760
- Coptic calendar: −15 – −14
- Discordian calendar: 1435
- Ethiopian calendar: 261–262
- Hebrew calendar: 4029–4030
- Hindu calendars
- Vikram Samvat: 325–326
- Shaka Samvat: 190–191
- Kali Yuga: 3369–3370
- Holocene calendar: 10269
- Iranian calendar: 353 BP – 352 BP
- Islamic calendar: 364 BH – 363 BH
- Javanese calendar: 148–149
- Julian calendar: 269; CCLXIX
- Korean calendar: 2602
- Minguo calendar: 1643 before ROC 民前1643年
- Nanakshahi calendar: −1199
- Seleucid era: 580/581 AG
- Thai solar calendar: 811–812
- Tibetan calendar: ས་ཕོ་བྱི་བ་ལོ་ (male Earth-Rat); 395 or 14 or −758 — to — ས་མོ་གླང་ལོ་ (female Earth-Ox); 396 or 15 or −757

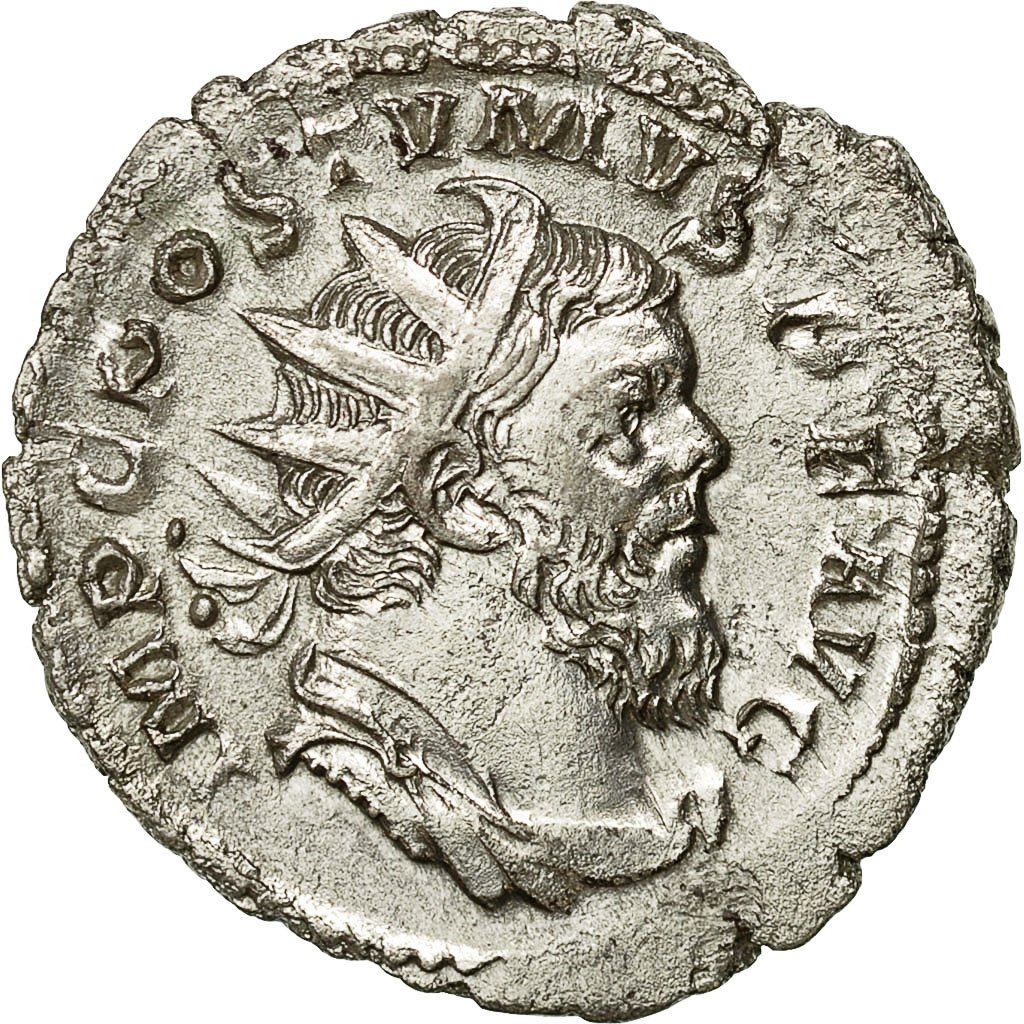
Emperor Postumus (r. 260–269)

Year 269 (CCLXIX) was a common year starting on Friday of the Julian calendar. At the time, it was known as the Year of the Consulship of Claudius and Paternus (or, less frequently, year 1022 Ab urbe condita). The denomination 269 for this year has been used since the early medieval period, when the Anno Domini calendar era became the prevalent method in Europe for naming years.

== Events ==
=== By place ===
==== Roman Empire ====
- Second Gothic invasion: The Goths and other German tribes attack Bosphorean towns on the coast of the Black Sea. Some 2,000 ships and 320,000 men from the Danube enter Roman territory. Emperor Claudius II defeats the invaders and receives the title Gothicus for his triumph. Many of the prisoners will serve in the Roman legions and settle in vacant lands in the Danubian provinces.
- Claudius II travels to Sirmium and prepares a war against the Vandals, who raid Pannonia.
- The Heruli capture Athens and raid the Aegean Islands as far as Crete and Rhodes.
- Marcus Cassianius Latinius Postumus is killed by his own troops, after not allowing them to sack the city of Mogontiacum.

==== Near East ====
- Queen Zenobia conquers Syria, Palestine, Lebanon, parts of Mesopotamia and Anatolia and Egypt, giving her control of Rome's grain supply. The library at Alexandria is partly burned during a raid by Zabdas, general of Zenobia.

=== By topic ===
==== Religion ====
- January 5 – Pope Felix I succeeds Dionysius as the 26th pope of Rome.
- Paul of Samosata is deposed as Patriarch of Antioch (though he is not removed until 272).

== Births ==
- Chi Jian (or Daohui), Chinese general (d. 339)
- Murong Hui, Chinese general and politician (d. 333)

== Deaths ==
- Jingū, Japanese empress and regent (b. 169)
- Justin the Confessor, Christian priest and martyr
- Liu Yin (or Xiuran), Chinese general and administrator
- Lu Kai (or Jingfeng), Chinese general and politician (b. 198)
- Marcus Aurelius Marius, Gallic general and emperor
- Marcus Cassianius Latinius Postumus, Gallic emperor
- Ulpius Cornelius Laelianus, Gallic emperor and usurper
- Wang Xiang (or Xiuzheng), Chinese politician (b. 185)
- Xin Xianying, Chinese noblewoman and advisor (b. 191)
