= 174 BC =

174 BC in various calendars
- Gregorian calendar: 174 BC; CLXXIV BC
- Ab urbe condita: 580
- Ancient Egypt era: XXXIII dynasty, 150
- Pharaoh: Ptolemy VI Philometor, 7
- Ancient Greek Olympiad (summer): 151st Olympiad, year 3
- Assyrian calendar: 4577
- Balinese saka calendar: N/A
- Bengali calendar: −767 – −766
- Berber calendar: 777
- Buddhist calendar: 371
- Burmese calendar: −811
- Byzantine calendar: 5335–5336
- Chinese calendar: 丙寅年 (Fire Tiger); 2524 or 2317 — to — 丁卯年 (Fire Rabbit); 2525 or 2318
- Coptic calendar: −457 – −456
- Discordian calendar: 993
- Ethiopian calendar: −181 – −180
- Hebrew calendar: 3587–3588
- Hindu calendars
- Vikram Samvat: −117 – −116
- Shaka Samvat: N/A
- Kali Yuga: 2927–2928
- Holocene calendar: 9827
- Iranian calendar: 795 BP – 794 BP
- Islamic calendar: 819 BH – 818 BH
- Javanese calendar: N/A
- Julian calendar: N/A
- Korean calendar: 2160
- Minguo calendar: 2085 before ROC 民前2085年
- Nanakshahi calendar: −1641
- Seleucid era: 138/139 AG
- Thai solar calendar: 369–370
- Tibetan calendar: མེ་ཕོ་སྟག་ལོ་ (male Fire-Tiger) −47 or −428 or −1200 — to — མེ་མོ་ཡོས་ལོ་ (female Fire-Hare) −46 or −427 or −1199

Year 174 BC was a year of the pre-Julian Roman calendar. At the time it was known as the Year of the Consulship of Paullulus and Scaevola (or, less frequently, year 580 Ab urbe condita). The denomination 174 BC for this year has been used since the early medieval period, when the Anno Domini calendar era became the prevalent method in Europe for naming years.

== Events ==
=== By place ===
==== Rome ====
- The first street pavements were laid in Rome.

==== Mongolia ====
- The Xiongnu attack the Yuezhi, and force them away from Gansu.

== Deaths ==
- Mete Khan, emperor and founder of the Xiongnu Empire, who has united various Hun confederations under his rule (b. 234 BC)
- Publius Aelius Paetus, Roman consul and censor
- Titus Quinctius Flamininus, Roman general and statesman whose skillful diplomacy has enabled him to establish a Roman protectorate over Greece (b. c. 227 BC) (approximate date)
