= Class 155 =

Class 155 may refer to:

- British Rail Class 155
- DR Class 250, known as the Class 155 since 1992
