= 154 =

154 may refer to:

- AD 154, a year
- 154 BC, a year
- 154 (number), the natural number following 153 and preceding 155
- 154 (album)
- 154 (New Jersey bus), United States
- 154 (Leicestershire Yeomanry) Field Regiment
- 154th Infantry Brigade (United Kingdom)
- UFC 154
- Kosmos 154
- Ross 154
- Sonnet 154
- Theatre 154
