= 262 =

262 in various calendars
Gregorian calendar	262; CCLXII
Ab urbe condita	1015
Assyrian calendar	5012
Balinese saka calendar	183–184
Bengali calendar	−332 – −331
Berber calendar	1212
Buddhist calendar	806
Burmese calendar	−376
Byzantine calendar	5770–5771
Chinese calendar	辛巳年 (Metal Snake); 2959 or 2752 — to — 壬午年 (Water Horse); 2960 or 2753
Coptic calendar	−22 – −21
Discordian calendar	1428
Ethiopian calendar	254–255
Hebrew calendar	4022–4023
- Hindu calendars
Vikram Samvat	318–319
Shaka Samvat	183–184
Kali Yuga	3362–3363
Holocene calendar	10262
Iranian calendar	360 BP – 359 BP
Islamic calendar	371 BH – 370 BH
Javanese calendar	141–142
Julian calendar	262; CCLXII
Korean calendar	2595
Minguo calendar	1650 before ROC 民前1650年
Nanakshahi calendar	−1206
Seleucid era	573/574 AG
Thai solar calendar	804–805
Tibetan calendar	ལྕགས་མོ་སྦྲུལ་ལོ་ (female Iron-Snake); 388 or 7 or −765 — to — ཆུ་ཕོ་རྟ་ལོ་ (male Water-Horse); 389 or 8 or −764

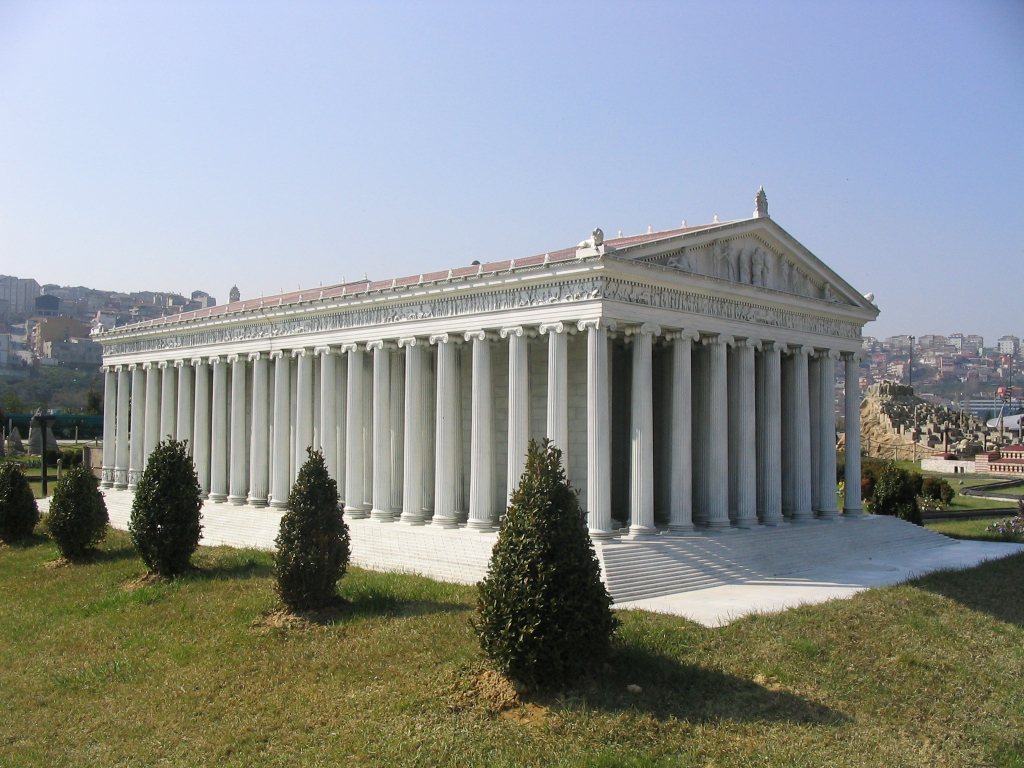
Temple of Artemis (Ephesus)

Year 262 (CCLXII) was a common year starting on Wednesday of the Julian calendar. At the time, it was known as the Year of the Consulship of Gallienus and Faustianus (or, less frequently, year 1015 Ab urbe condita). The denomination 262 for this year has been used since the early medieval period, when the Anno Domini calendar era became the prevalent method in Europe for naming years.

== Events ==
=== By place ===
==== Roman Empire ====
- The Goths invade Asia Minor and destroy the Temple of Artemis in Ephesus.
- An earthquake strikes Ephesus and Pergamon and another strikes Cyrene.
- The Heruls accompany the Goths, ravaging the coasts of the Black Sea and the Aegean.

== Deaths ==
- Ji Kang (or Shuye), Chinese Daoist philosopher and poet (b. 223)
- Marinus of Caesarea, Roman soldier and Christian martyr
- Valerian, Roman consul and emperor (approximate date)
