= NH 155 =

NH 155 may refer to:

- National Highway 155 (India)
- New Hampshire Route 155, United States
