= Siege of Alexandria (297–298) =

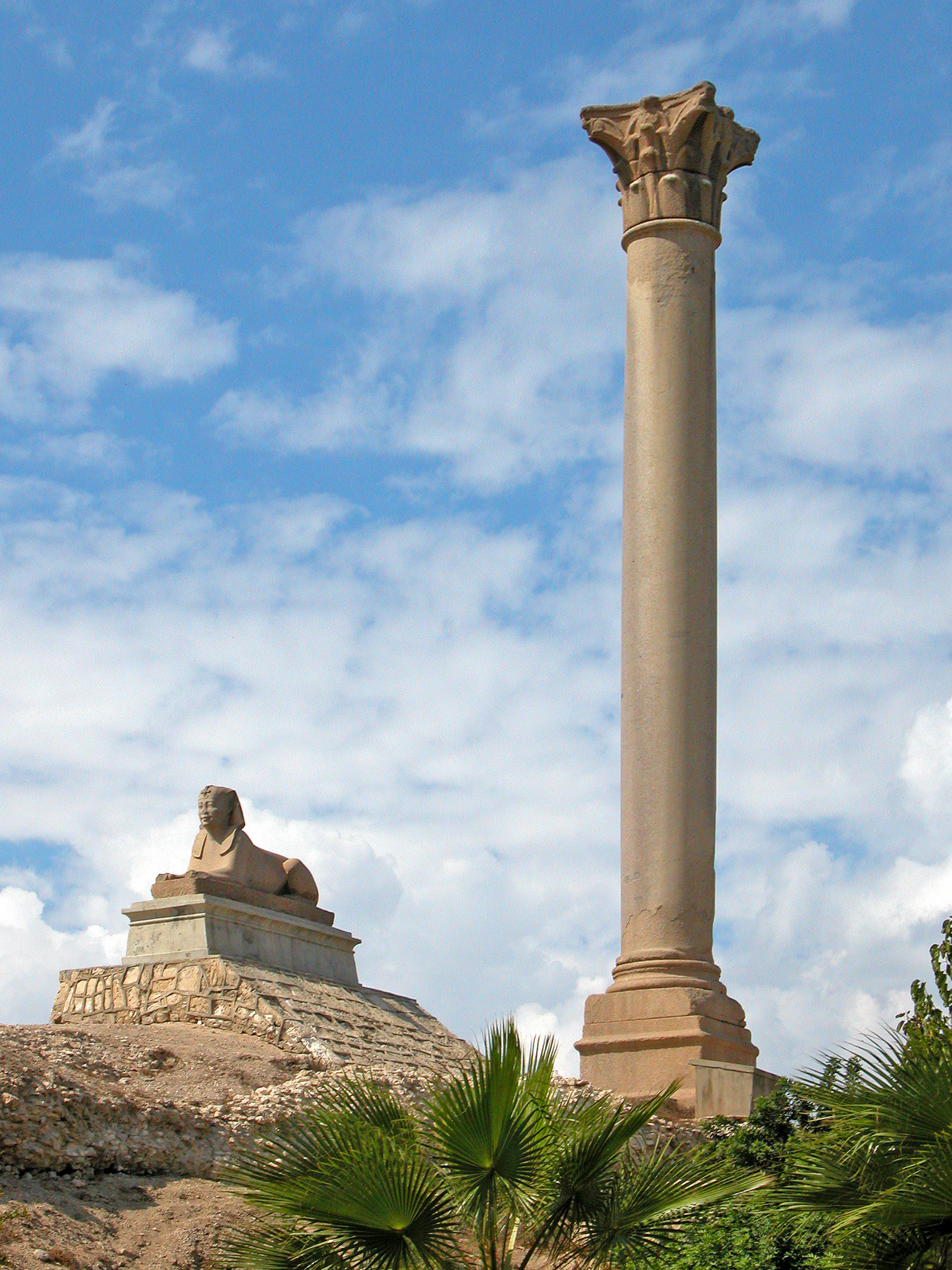
Diocletian's victory column in Alexandria still stands

The city of Alexandria was besieged by the Roman emperor Diocletian for eights months in 297–298 after it joined an Egypt-wide revolt led by Lucius Domitius Domitianus and Aurelius Achilleus. The city ultimately surrendered and was treated severely by Diocletian. Diocletian's victory column in Alexandria still stands.

== Background ==
In 296, Persia invaded Roman Syria and defeated the emperor Galerius at the battle of Carrhae. In March 297, a new tax edict was published in Egypt. These two events precipitated a province-wide rebellion in Egypt, although whether the rebels were merely taking advantage of the withdrawal of troops for the Syrian front or were acting in concert with the Persians is not known. The emperor Diocletian suspected the latter and even blamed the Manichaeans as spies.

The Egyptian revolt was led by an imperial claimant named Lucius Domitius Domitianus. He was dead by the end of 297, but the revolt was continued under Aurelius Achilleus, although the exact relationship between these two is uncertain. Achilleus may have been Domitius' successor acclaimed as emperor, his subordinate as corrector or even the power behind the throne.

At the time of the siege, Alexandria was the second largest city in the Roman Empire, behind only Rome.

== Siege ==
When the summer imposed a lull in the fighting in Syria, Diocletian marched a detachment of the army to Egypt to put down the revolt. He left the reduction of the various rebel-held cities to his subordinates but laid siege to Alexandria himself. Achilleus led the defence.

Diocletian's first action was to surround the city and cut its aqueducts. He constructed a ditch and a contravallation. According to Jerome, the siege lasted eight months. Eutropius says "almost eight month[s]". The prologned resistance was possible in part because Alexandria was capable of producing its own weaponry. Achilleus may have hoped that a new Persian offensive would force the lifting of the siege. Diocletian preferred to wait out the Alexandrians while his other armies snuffed out the revolt elsewhere in Egypt.

Alexandria surrendered in the spring of 298. A document dated 11 May 298 indicates that it was possible to travel to Alexandria at that time, providing a terminus ante quem for the end of the siege. According to Eutropius, Achilleus was killed. According to Aurelius Victor, the siege was terminated "by negotiations and [Achilleus] paid the penalty."

== Aftermath ==
The aftermath of the siege is more famous than the siege itself. According to Eutropius, "Diocletian behaved bitterly after his victory, defiling Egypt with serious proscriptions and slaughter." According to John Malalas, Diocletian swore that he would put the city to the sack and slaughter all rebels until the blood reached his horse's knees. His horse stumbled over a corpse, its knee struck the ground, and he was forced to call off the sack prematurely. The Alexandrians later erected a bronze statue in honour of the horse. The story of the stumbling horse may represent Diocletian's own propaganda, justifying a pragmatic leniency by a sign from the gods. He afterwards diverted a portion of Rome's grain supply to Alexandria and exempted the city from taxes temporarily. On the other hand, Orosius records the city was sacked and does not mention any mercy on Diocletian's part.

After the revolt, Diocletian introduced several reforms to the administration of Egypt, one being the integration of Alexandria into Egypt proper and the division of the latter into three provinces. According to Eusebius of Caesarea, Diocletain remained in Egypt for some time to restore Roman authority. He campaigned against the Blemmyes, but withdrew Roman forces from the Dodekaschoinos.

The victory column known erroneously since the Middle Ages as Pompey's Pillar was erected in Alexandria to celebrate Diocletian's victory. The inscription indicates it was erected by the prefect Posthumus. It is "the largest [triumphal column] outside of Rome or Constantinople" and also "one of the largest [and heaviest] ancient monoliths ever erected."

== Bibliography ==
- Balzotti, Jonathan M.; Crosby, Richard Benjamin (2014). "Diocletian's Victory Column and the Rhetoric of Spectacular Disruption". Rhetoric Society Quarterly. 44 (4): 323–342.
- Fratantuono, Lee (2023). Diocletian and the Military Restoration of Rome. Pen & Sword.
- Johnson, Allan Chester (1950). "Lucius Domitius Domitianus Augustus". Classical Philology. 45 (1): 13–21. JSTOR 266175.
- Solomon Yirga, Felege-Selam (2020). The Chronicle of John of Nikiu: Historical Writing in Post-Roman Egypt (PhD dissertation). The Ohio State University.
- Solomon Yirga, Felege-Selam (2025). The Chronicle of John of Nikiu: Coping with Crisis in Post-Roman Egypt. University of California Press.
- Williams, Stephen (1997). Diocletian and the Roman Recovery. Routledge.
