= Domitius Domitianus =

Roman imperial pretender

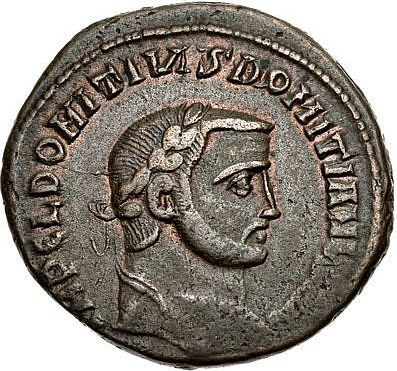
- Nummus of Domitianus, struck at the Alexandria mint. Obverse legend: IMP C L DOMITIVS DOMITIANVS AVG.

Roman emperor
- Reign: 297, against Diocletian
- Successor: Achilleus
- Died: December 297; Alexandria, Egypt
Names
- Lucius Domitius Domitianus
Regnal name
- Imperator Caesar Lucius Domitius Domitianus Augustus

Lucius Domitius Domitianus, rarely enumerated as Domitian III, was a Roman usurper against Diocletian, who seized power for a short time in Egypt.

== History ==
Nothing is known of the background and family of Domitianus. He may have served as prefect of Egypt before he proclaimed himself emperor, though no known document makes his previous position clear.

Domitianus revolted against Diocletian in 297 AD; it is possible that the rebellion was sparked by a new tax edict, but this is uncertain. Numismatic and papyrological evidence support Domitianus's claiming the purple.

Domitianus died in December of the same year, when Diocletian went to Aegyptus to quell the revolt. Domitianus' corrector, Aurelius Achilleus, who was responsible for the defense of Alexandria, appears to have succeeded to Domitianus' claim to the empire; in fact, it was only in March 298 that Diocletian succeeded in re-conquering the city.

== Sources ==
- DiMaio, Michael, "L. Domitius Domitianus and Aurelius Achilleus (ca.296/297-ca.297/298)", De Imperatoribus Romanis
