= Bassilla =

Bassilla (fl. 3rd century CE), was a mime actress in Ancient Rome.

A memorial was made to her memory by her colleague, the actor-dancer Heracleides, at the Roman amphitheatre of Aquileia. The memorial consists of a stone stele, which features a carved portrait of Bassilla, shown in fine, modest clothing and a dignified pose. Beneath the portrait there is a Greek-language inscription praising her.

She was an actress in Roman mime, described as a stage performer who acted both in speaking roles in theatre plays and pantomime performances, as a dancer, and as part of the chorus. Her fame reached across many cities of the Empire. She was referred to as an archimima, which was the title of the leading lady in a Roman theatre, and her epitaph praised her as a "10th Muse". She may have been particularly noted for performing death scenes, as her epitaph describes her as having "died many a time on stage - but never thus!".

A role she is believed to have performed was the famous comedy role of the plotting wife Charition.
