= Aurelius Achilleus =

Roman rebel

- "Achilleus, the great ruler"

Roman emperor
- Reign: 297–298, against Diocletian
- Predecessor: Domitius Domitianus
- Died: 298; Alexandria, Egypt

Aurelius Achilleus (fl. 297–298 AD) was a rebel against the Roman emperor Diocletian in Egypt in 297 AD.

All literary sources name Achilleus as an imperial pretender and the leader of the rebellion, but numismatic and papyrological evidence attribute that role to Domitius Domitianus instead. Egyptian papyri instead attest Achilleus as corrector under Domitianus. He seems to have succeeded to leadership of the rebellion after Domitianus died in December 297.

Achilleus was at length taken by Diocletian after a siege of eight months in Alexandria, and put to death in 298 AD.

Political offices
| Preceded by Aristius Optatus | Prefectus of Aegyptus; 297 | Succeeded by Aemilius Rusticianus |
