= Xing Yong =

Chinese Cao Wei state official (died 223)

- 邢顒

Minister of Ceremonies (太常)
- In office ? – 223
- Monarch: Cao Pi

Colonel-Director of Retainers (司隷校尉)
- In office ?–?
- Monarch: Cao Pi

Supervisor of the Masters of Writing (尚書僕射)
- In office 220 – ?
- Monarch: Cao Pi

Palace Attendant (侍中)
- In office 220 – ?
- Monarch: Cao Pi

Grand Tutor (太傅)
- In office ? – 220
- Monarch: Emperor Xian of Han
- Chancellor: Cao Cao

Junior Tutor of the Crown Prince (太子少傅)
- In office ? – 220
- Monarch: Emperor Xian of Han
- Chancellor: Cao Cao

Personal details
- Born: Unknown; Xiong County, Hebei
- Died: 223
- Children: Xing You
- Occupation: Official
- Courtesy name: Zi'ang (子昂)
- Peerage: Secondary Marquis (關內侯)

Xing Yong (died 223), courtesy name Zi'ang, was a government official of the state of Cao Wei during the Three Kingdoms period of China. He previously served under the warlord Cao Cao in the late Eastern Han dynasty. Having fled to the far north in the early parts of the civil war, he became known for his honesty and virtue, and would serve in instructional roles for two of Cao Cao's sons.

== Early life ==
Xing Yong was from Mo County (鄚縣), Hejian Commandery (河間郡), which is located south of present-day Xiong County, Hebei. In his early years, he was nominated as a xiaolian (civil service candidate) by his home commandery and offered the position of an assistant official under the Minister over the Masses (司徒). However, he rejected the offer, changed his name, and moved to Youbeiping Commandery (右北平郡; around present-day Tangshan, Hebei), where he met and befriended Tian Chou and travelled around with him.

== Service under Cao Cao ==
Five years later, around the year 207, the warlord Cao Cao conquered Ji Province (covering much of present-day Hebei and parts of Shandong). When Xing Yong heard about it, he told Tian Chou: "It has been over 20 years since the Yellow Turban Rebellion. The Han Empire is in a state of chaos and the people are displaced from their homes. I heard that Lord Cao upholds law and order. The people are tired of living in a chaotic era and hope that peace will be restored soon. I want to be a pioneer in all this." He then returned to Hejian Commandery. Tian Chou remarked: "Xing Yong is the first person among the common people to come to that realisation."

Xing Yong sought an audience with Cao Cao and volunteered to guide Cao Cao and his army on a campaign against Yuan Shao's sons and their Wuhuan allies at Liucheng (柳城; southwest of present-day Chaoyang, Liaoning). Cao Cao appointed him as an Assistant Officer (從事) in Ji Province. At the time, Xing Yong was famous for his virtuous conduct.

Cao Cao subsequently promoted Xing Yong to the position of Chief (長) of Guangzong County (廣宗縣; southeast of present-day Guangzong County, Hebei). Xing Yong resigned later when his superior, the commandery administrator, died. When other officials reported him to Cao Cao (because they saw his resignation as an irresponsible action), Cao Cao said: "Xing Yong had a close relationship with his superior. He wants to show his devout loyalty to his superior. There is no need to fault him for that."

Cao Cao later summoned Xing Yong back to serve as an assistant official under him before appointing him as the Prefect (令) of Tang County (唐縣; northwest of present-day Shunping County, Hebei). During his tenure, Xing Yong promoted agriculture and civil culture among the county residents. Some time later, Cao Cao recalled him to serve in his administrative office before reassigning him to Zuopingyi Commandery (左馮翊; around present-day Weinan, Shaanxi). Xing Yong resigned later due to illness.

Around 214, when Cao Cao was selecting officials to serve in the personal staffs of his sons, he said: "The personal staffs of nobles should be staffed by officials who are as familiar with rules and protocol as Xing Yong." Fitting his policy of appointing staff that were not close to the sons, he then appointed Xing Yong as Assistant of the Household (家丞), the head of the household staff to his fourth son, the poet Cao Zhi. As Xing Yong strictly followed the rules and protocol without exception, Cao Zhi, who was known for his unbridled behaviour, disliked Xing Yong and distanced himself from Xing Yong. Liu Zhen (劉楨), a skilled writer and a favoured member of Cao Zhi's household, was concerned by this and wrote to Cao Zhi: "Xing Yong is one of the talents from the north. Since young, he was already known for conducting himself with virtue and morality. He is a true gentleman as he shows humble and polite behaviour, and he thinks more than he speaks. I do not think I am worthy enough to serve you alongside him. However, I have received especially generous treatment from you, while Xing Yong, in contrast, has been shunned and given the cold shoulder. I am worried that people will start criticising you for associating yourself with the non-virtuous and being disrespectful towards the virtuous, and for favouring a servant over your steward. You will be in deep trouble if such criticisms indirectly affect your father's reputation as well. I feel very uneasy when I ponder over this."

Cao Cao later recalled Xing Yong to serve as a military adviser under him before reassigning him as Senior Clerk in the Department of the East, which was responsible for financial matters. Around the time, Cao Cao had not designated one of his sons as the heir apparent to his vassal kingdom yet. His preferred choice was Cao Zhi; Cao Zhi's associates such as Ding Yi also tried to help Cao Zhi win the succession by praising him in front of Cao Cao. When Cao Cao sought views from officials about the choice of heir, he consulted Xing Yong, given his former role as head of a candidate's household, who advised "It is against tradition to choose a younger son over an older son to be one's heir apparent. I hope that Your Highness will reconsider this carefully!" Cao Cao understood what Xing Yong meant, and eventually designated his eldest surviving son, Cao Pi, as his heir apparent. He then appointed Xing Yong as the Junior Tutor to the Crown Prince (太子少傅) before promoting him to Grand Tutor (太傅) later.

== Service in Wei ==
Cao Cao died in March 220 and was succeeded by Cao Pi as the ruler of his vassal kingdom. Later that year, Cao Pi usurped the throne from the figurehead Emperor Xian, ended the Eastern Han dynasty, and established the state of Cao Wei with himself as the new emperor. After his coronation, Cao Pi appointed Xing Yong as a Palace Attendant (侍中) and Supervisor of the Masters of Writing (尚書僕射), and enfeoffed him as a Secondary Marquis (關內侯). Xing Yong was subsequently promoted to Colonel-Director of Retainers (司隷校尉) and then Minister of Ceremonies (太常).

Xing Yong died in 223. His son, Xing You (邢友), inherited his peerage as a Secondary Marquis.

== Descendants ==
Xing Qiao (邢喬), a great-grandson of Xing Yong, had the courtesy name Zengbo (曾伯). Xing Qiao's mother was a daughter of Li Yin (李胤); he was known for his talent and virtuous conduct. During the Yuankang era (291–299) of the reign of Emperor Hui of the Western Jin dynasty, Xing Qiao served as a supervisor of the selection bureau of the imperial secretariat alongside Liu Huan (劉渙), and was promoted to Colonel-Director of Retainers (司隷校尉) shortly after. Xing Qiao was killed by Sima Xiao, Prince of Fanyang, on 20 Jun 306.

== See also ==
- Lists of people of the Three Kingdoms
