= AD 128 =

128 in various calendars
- Gregorian calendar: 128; CXXVIII
- Ab urbe condita: 881
- Assyrian calendar: 4878
- Balinese saka calendar: 49–50
- Bengali calendar: −466 – −465
- Berber calendar: 1078
- Buddhist calendar: 672
- Burmese calendar: −510
- Byzantine calendar: 5636–5637
- Chinese calendar: 丁卯年 (Fire Rabbit); 2825 or 2618 — to — 戊辰年 (Earth Dragon); 2826 or 2619
- Coptic calendar: −156 – −155
- Discordian calendar: 1294
- Ethiopian calendar: 120–121
- Hebrew calendar: 3888–3889
- Hindu calendars
- Vikram Samvat: 184–185
- Shaka Samvat: 49–50
- Kali Yuga: 3228–3229
- Holocene calendar: 10128
- Iranian calendar: 494 BP – 493 BP
- Islamic calendar: 509 BH – 508 BH
- Javanese calendar: 3–4
- Julian calendar: 128; CXXVIII
- Korean calendar: 2461
- Minguo calendar: 1784 before ROC 民前1784年
- Nanakshahi calendar: −1340
- Seleucid era: 439/440 AG
- Thai solar calendar: 670–671
- Tibetan calendar: མེ་མོ་ཡོས་ལོ་ (female Fire-Hare); 254 or −127 or −899 — to — ས་ཕོ་འབྲུག་ལོ་ (male Earth-Dragon); 255 or −126 or −898

Year 128 (CXXVIII) was a leap year starting on Wednesday of the Julian calendar. At the time, it was known as the Year of the Consulship of Calpurnius and Libo (or, less frequently, year 881 Ab urbe condita). The denomination 128 for this year has been used since the early medieval period, when the Anno Domini calendar era became the prevalent method in Europe for naming years.

== Events ==
=== By place ===
==== Roman Empire ====
- Emperor Hadrian visits the Roman province of North Africa, in order to inspect Legio III Augusta stationed at Lambaesis. For strategic reasons, the legionnaires are located in the Aurès Mountains.
- Hadrian's Wall is completed in Britain. Built mostly of stone in the east and with a wooden palisade in the west. They construct at least 16 forts, with about 15,000 legionaries digging ditches, quarrying rock and cutting stone, preventing idleness which led to unrest and rebellions in the ranks.
- Roman agriculture declines, as imports from Egypt and North Africa depress wheat prices, making it unprofitable to farm, and forcing many farmers off the land.
- Roman bakeries produce dozens of bread varieties, and the Romans distribute free bread for the poor.
- Hadrian begins his inspection of the provinces of Greece, Asia Minor and Egypt.

==== Asia ====
- King Gaeru of Baekje succeeds to the throne of Baekje in the Korean Peninsula (until 166).

=== By topic ===
==== Arts and sciences ====
- The fossils of large prehistoric animals are discovered in Dalmatia.
- The Pantheon in Rome is finished.

== Births ==
- Xun Shuang, Chinese politician and writer (d. 190)

== Deaths ==
- Giru of Baekje, Korean ruler
