= AD 190 =

190 in various calendars
- Gregorian calendar: 190; CXC
- Ab urbe condita: 943
- Assyrian calendar: 4940
- Balinese saka calendar: 111–112
- Bengali calendar: −404 – −403
- Berber calendar: 1140
- Buddhist calendar: 734
- Burmese calendar: −448
- Byzantine calendar: 5698–5699
- Chinese calendar: 己巳年 (Earth Snake); 2887 or 2680 — to — 庚午年 (Metal Horse); 2888 or 2681
- Coptic calendar: −94 – −93
- Discordian calendar: 1356
- Ethiopian calendar: 182–183
- Hebrew calendar: 3950–3951
- Hindu calendars
- Vikram Samvat: 246–247
- Shaka Samvat: 111–112
- Kali Yuga: 3290–3291
- Holocene calendar: 10190
- Iranian calendar: 432 BP – 431 BP
- Islamic calendar: 445 BH – 444 BH
- Javanese calendar: 67–68
- Julian calendar: 190; CXC
- Korean calendar: 2523
- Minguo calendar: 1722 before ROC 民前1722年
- Nanakshahi calendar: −1278
- Seleucid era: 501/502 AG
- Thai solar calendar: 732–733
- Tibetan calendar: ས་མོ་སྦྲུལ་ལོ་ (female Earth-Snake); 316 or −65 or −837 — to — ལྕགས་ཕོ་རྟ་ལོ་ (male Iron-Horse); 317 or −64 or −836

Year 190 (CXC) was a common year starting on Thursday of the Julian calendar. At the time, it was known as the Year of the Consulship of Aurelius and Sura (or, less frequently, year 943 Ab urbe condita). The denomination 190 for this year has been used since the early medieval period, when the Anno Domini calendar era became the prevalent method in Europe for naming years.

== Events ==
=== By place ===
==== Roman Empire ====
- A part of Rome burns; Emperor Commodus orders the city to be rebuilt, under the name Colonia Commodiana.
- At the climax of his power, the freedman Marcus Aurelius Cleander appoints 25 men as Roman consuls. Amongst these is Lucius Septimius Severus, who later becomes emperor during the Year of the Five Emperors.
- A Roman road crosses the Alps, by the Simplon Pass.

==== China ====
- First year of the Chuping era of the Chinese Han dynasty.
- The Campaign against Dong Zhuo begins. During the Battle of Xingyang, Cao Cao's army is defeated by Dong Zhuo.
- Luoyang is burned and plundered by the forces of Dong Zhuo. The court is moved to Chang'an.

==== Parthia ====
- Osroes II, controlling Media, claims the throne of the Parthian Empire. King Vologases IV of Parthia puts down the rebellion and restores order.

=== By topic ===
==== Art and Science ====
- Cleomedes teaches that the moon does not glow on its own, but rather reflects sunlight.

==== Economic ====
- Egypt (under Roman rule) is impoverished due to an inflation rate of 100% during the previous decade.
- The percentage of silver in the Egyptian denarius is lowered from 90% to 70%.

== Births ==
- Gaius Furius Sabinius Aquila Timesitheus, Roman praetorian prefect (d. 243)
- Liu Yin (or Xiuran), Chinese general of the Shu Han state (d. 269)
- Ma Su, Chinese general and strategist of the Shu Han state (d. 228)
- Quintus Egnatius Proculus, Roman politician (approximate date)
- Wang Ji (or Boyu), Chinese general of the Cao Wei state (d. 261)

== Deaths ==
- March 6 – Liu Bian, Chinese emperor (poisoned by Dong Zhuo) (b. 176)
- April 19 – Marcus Aurelius Cleander, Roman praetorian prefect
- Athenagoras of Athens, Greek Christian apologist (b. 133)
- Julius of Rome, Roman politician (executed by Commodus)
- Xun Shuang, Chinese politician and writer (b. 128)
- Zhou Bi, Chinese official (executed by Dong Zhuo)
- Emperor Seimu of Japan, according to legend.

== Sources ==
- Sellwood, David (1983). "Parthian Coins". In Yarshater, Ehsan (ed.). The Cambridge History of Iran: The Seleucid, Parthian and Sasanian Periods. Vol. 3(1). Cambridge: Cambridge University Press. pp. 279–298. ISBN 0-521-20092-X.
