= AD 176 =

176 in various calendars
- Gregorian calendar: 176; CLXXVI
- Ab urbe condita: 929
- Assyrian calendar: 4926
- Balinese saka calendar: 97–98
- Bengali calendar: −418 – −417
- Berber calendar: 1126
- Buddhist calendar: 720
- Burmese calendar: −462
- Byzantine calendar: 5684–5685
- Chinese calendar: 乙卯年 (Wood Rabbit); 2873 or 2666 — to — 丙辰年 (Fire Dragon); 2874 or 2667
- Coptic calendar: −108 – −107
- Discordian calendar: 1342
- Ethiopian calendar: 168–169
- Hebrew calendar: 3936–3937
- Hindu calendars
- Vikram Samvat: 232–233
- Shaka Samvat: 97–98
- Kali Yuga: 3276–3277
- Holocene calendar: 10176
- Iranian calendar: 446 BP – 445 BP
- Islamic calendar: 460 BH – 459 BH
- Javanese calendar: 52–53
- Julian calendar: 176; CLXXVI
- Korean calendar: 2509
- Minguo calendar: 1736 before ROC 民前1736年
- Nanakshahi calendar: −1292
- Seleucid era: 487/488 AG
- Thai solar calendar: 718–719
- Tibetan calendar: ཤིང་མོ་ཡོས་ལོ་ (female Wood-Hare); 302 or −79 or −851 — to — མེ་ཕོ་འབྲུག་ལོ་ (male Fire-Dragon); 303 or −78 or −850

Year 176 (CLXXVI) was a leap year starting on Sunday of the Julian calendar. At the time, it was known as the Year of the Consulship of Proculus and Aper (or, less frequently, year 929 Ab urbe condita). The denomination 176 for this year has been used since the early medieval period, when the Anno Domini calendar era became the prevalent method in Europe for naming years.

== Events ==
=== By place ===
==== Roman Empire ====
- November 27 – Emperor Marcus Aurelius grants his son Commodus the rank of Imperator, and makes him Supreme Commander of the Roman legions.
- December 23 – Marcus Aurelius and Commodus enter Rome after a campaign north of the Alps, and receive a triumph for their victories over the Germanic tribes.
- The Equestrian Statue of Marcus Aurelius is made. It is now kept at Museo Capitolini in Rome (approximate date).

== Births ==
- Fa Zheng, Chinese nobleman and adviser (d. 220)
- Liu Bian, Chinese emperor of the Han dynasty (d. 190)
- Ma Chao, Chinese general and warlord (d. 222)

== Deaths ==
- Faustina the Younger, Roman empress (b. AD 130)
- Marcus Macrinius Avitus Catonius Vindex, Roman politician
