= Water Monkey =

Ninth combination of the sexagenary cycle

Chinese name
- Chinese: 壬申
Transcriptions
Standard Mandarin
- Hanyu Pinyin: rénshēn

Vietnamese name
- Vietnamese alphabet: Nhâm Thân
- Chữ Hán: 壬申

South Korean name
- Hangul: 임신
- Hanja: 壬申
Transcriptions
- Revised Romanization: imsin

Japanese name
- Kanji: 壬申
- Kana: みずのえさる じんしん
Transcriptions
- Romanization: mizunoesaru jinshin

Sexagenary cycle
01; Wood Rat	02; Wood Ox	03; Fire Tiger	04; Fire Rabbit	05; Earth Dragon	06; Earth Snake
07; Metal Horse	08; Metal Goat	09; Water Monkey	10; Water Rooster	11; Wood Dog	12; Wood Pig
13; Fire Rat	14; Fire Ox	15; Earth Tiger	16; Earth Rabbit	17; Metal Dragon	18; Metal Snake
19; Water Horse	20; Water Goat	21; Wood Monkey	22; Wood Rooster	23; Fire Dog	24; Fire Pig
25; Earth Rat	26; Earth Ox	27; Metal Tiger	28; Metal Rabbit	29; Water Dragon	30; Water Snake
31; Wood Horse	32; Wood Goat	33; Fire Monkey	34; Fire Rooster	35; Earth Dog	36; Earth Pig
37; Metal Rat	38; Metal Ox	39; Water Tiger	40; Water Rabbit	41; Wood Dragon	42; Wood Snake
43; Fire Horse	44; Fire Goat	45; Earth Monkey	46; Earth Rooster	47; Metal Dog	48; Metal Pig
49; Water Rat	50; Water Ox	51; Wood Tiger	52; Wood Rabbit	53; Fire Dragon	54; Fire Snake
55; Earth Horse	56; Earth Goat	57; Metal Monkey	58; Metal Rooster	59; Water Dog	60; Water Pig

Heavenly Stems ・ Earthly Branches

Water Monkey (Chinese: 壬申; pinyin: rénshēn) is the ninth combination of the sexagenary cycle of the Chinese zodiac. It is preceded by Metal Goat and followed by Water Rooster. In the traditional correspondence of the Heavenly Stems with the Five Phases, rén (壬) represents yang and Water, while the Earthly Branch shēn (申) corresponds to the Monkey zodiac.

The Jinshin War (Japanese: 壬申の乱) is named for the fact that it took place in 672, which was a year of the Water Monkey (Japanese: 壬申, romanized: jinshin).

== Water Monkey years ==
A year of the Water Monkey occurs every 60 years according to the following table:

1st millennium	2nd millennium	3rd millennium	4th millennium
12; 72; 132; 192; 252; 312; 372; 432; 492; 552; 612; 672; 732; 792; 852; 912; 972	1032; 1092; 1152; 1212; 1272; 1332; 1392; 1452; 1512; 1572; 1632; 1692; 1752; 1812; 1872; 1932; 1992	2052; 2112; 2172; 2232; 2292; 2352; 2412; 2472; 2532; 2592; 2652; 2712; 2772; 2832; 2892; 2952	3012; 3072; 3132; 3192; 3252; 3312; 3372; 3432; 3492; 3552; 3612; 3672; 3732; 3792; 3852; 3912; 3972

== Water Monkey months ==
When months are numbered using the sexagenary cycle, the seventh month of a year whose heavenly stem is 甲 (jiǎ) or 己 (jǐ) is a Water Monkey month.

== Water Monkey days ==
A Water Monkey day occurs every 60 days according to the following table:

2023	2024	2025	2026	2027	2028	2029
14 January; 15 March; 14 May; 13 July; 11 September; 10 November	9 January; 9 March; 8 May; 7 July; 5 September; 4 November	3 January; 4 March; 3 May; 2 July; 31 August; 30 October; 29 December	27 February; 28 April; 27 June; 26 August; 25 October; 24 December	22 February; 23 April; 22 June; 21 August; 20 October; 19 December	17 February; 17 April; 16 June; 15 August; 14 October; 13 December	11 February; 12 April; 11 June; 10 August; 9 October; 8 December
