= Metal Rooster =

58th combination of the sexagenary cycle

Chinese name
- Chinese: 辛酉
Transcriptions
Standard Mandarin
- Hanyu Pinyin: xīnyǒu

Vietnamese name
- Vietnamese alphabet: Tân Dậu
- Chữ Hán: 辛酉

South Korean name
- Hangul: 신유
- Hanja: 辛酉
Transcriptions
- Revised Romanization: sinyu

Japanese name
- Kanji: 辛酉
- Kana: かのととり しんゆう
Transcriptions
- Romanization: kanototori shin'yū

Sexagenary cycle
01; Wood Rat	02; Wood Ox	03; Fire Tiger	04; Fire Rabbit	05; Earth Dragon	06; Earth Snake
07; Metal Horse	08; Metal Goat	09; Water Monkey	10; Water Rooster	11; Wood Dog	12; Wood Pig
13; Fire Rat	14; Fire Ox	15; Earth Tiger	16; Earth Rabbit	17; Metal Dragon	18; Metal Snake
19; Water Horse	20; Water Goat	21; Wood Monkey	22; Wood Rooster	23; Fire Dog	24; Fire Pig
25; Earth Rat	26; Earth Ox	27; Metal Tiger	28; Metal Rabbit	29; Water Dragon	30; Water Snake
31; Wood Horse	32; Wood Goat	33; Fire Monkey	34; Fire Rooster	35; Earth Dog	36; Earth Pig
37; Metal Rat	38; Metal Ox	39; Water Tiger	40; Water Rabbit	41; Wood Dragon	42; Wood Snake
43; Fire Horse	44; Fire Goat	45; Earth Monkey	46; Earth Rooster	47; Metal Dog	48; Metal Pig
49; Water Rat	50; Water Ox	51; Wood Tiger	52; Wood Rabbit	53; Fire Dragon	54; Fire Snake
55; Earth Horse	56; Earth Goat	57; Metal Monkey	58; Metal Rooster	59; Water Dog	60; Water Pig

Heavenly Stems ・ Earthly Branches

Metal Rooster (Chinese: 辛酉; pinyin: xīnyǒu) is the 58th combination of the sexagenary cycle of the Chinese zodiac. It is preceded by Metal Monkey and followed by Water Dog. In the traditional correspondence of the Heavenly Stems with the Five Phases, xīn (辛) represents yin and Metal, while the Earthly Branch yǒu (酉) corresponds to the Rooster zodiac.

== Association with revolutions ==
In Chinese and Japanese tradition, it was believed that revolutions and dynastic changes were more likely to occur on Metal Rooster years. Due to this belief, the era name in Japan was often changed on Metal Rooser years to avoid social revolutions and natural disasters. The first such era was Engi, which began in 901. Except for a break during the Muromachi period, a new era name was proclaimed on every Metal Rooster year until Bunkyū in 1861.

The authors of the Nihon Shoki may have chosen 660 BC as a date for the accession of the legendary Emperor Jimmu because it was a Metal Rooster year, and because it was 1260 years before the reforms of Empress Suiko and Prince Shōtoku in 601.

== Metal Rooster years ==
A year of the Metal Rooster occurs every 60 years according to the following table:

1st millennium	2nd millennium	3rd millennium	4th millennium
1; 61; 121; 181; 241; 301; 361; 421; 481; 541; 601; 661; 721; 781; 841; 901; 961	1021; 1081; 1141; 1201; 1261; 1321; 1381; 1441; 1501; 1561; 1621; 1681; 1741; 1801; 1861; 1921; 1981	2041; 2101; 2161; 2221; 2281; 2341; 2401; 2461; 2521; 2581; 2641; 2701; 2761; 2821; 2881; 2941	3001; 3061; 3121; 3181; 3241; 3301; 3361; 3421; 3481; 3541; 3601; 3661; 3721; 3781; 3841; 3901; 3961

== Metal Rooster months ==
When months are numbered using the sexagenary cycle, the eighth month of a year whose heavenly stem is 戊 (wù) or 癸 (guǐ) is a Metal Rooster month.

== Metal Rooster days ==
A Metal Rooster day occurs every 60 days according to the following table:

2023	2024	2025	2026	2027	2028	2029
3 January; 4 March; 3 May; 2 July; 31 August; 30 October; 29 December	27 February; 27 April; 26 June; 25 August; 24 October; 23 December	21 February; 22 April; 21 June; 20 August; 19 October; 18 December	16 February; 17 April; 16 June; 15 August; 14 October; 13 December	11 February; 12 April; 11 June; 10 August; 9 October; 8 December	6 February; 6 April; 5 June; 4 August; 3 October; 2 December	31 January; 1 April; 31 May; 30 July; 28 September; 27 November
