= Sexagenary cycle =

Historical method for reckoning time in China

Chinese name
- Chinese: 六十干支
- Literal meaning: sixty stem branch
Transcriptions
Standard Mandarin
- Hanyu Pinyin: liùshí gānzhī
- IPA: [ljôʊ.ʂǐ kán.ʈʂí]

Alternative Chinese name
- Chinese: 干支
- Literal meaning: stem branch
Transcriptions
Standard Mandarin
- Hanyu Pinyin: gānzhī
- IPA: [kán.ʈʂí]

Vietnamese name
- Vietnamese: Can Chi; Thiên Can Địa Chi; Thập Can Thập Nhị Chi
- Chữ Hán: 干支 天干地支 十干十二支

Korean name
- Hangul: 간지 육십갑자 육십간지 십이간지
- Hanja: 干支 六十甲子 六十干支 十二干支
Transcriptions
- Revised Romanization: ganji yuksipgapja yuksipganji sipiganji

Japanese name
- Kanji: 干支 天干地支 十干十二支 六十干支
- Kana: えと てんかんちし じっかんじゅうにし ろくじっかんし
Transcriptions
- Romanization: eto tenkanchishi jikkanjūnishi rokujikkanshi

Manchu name
- Manchu script: ᠴᡳᡴᡨᡝᠨ ᡤᠠᡵᡤᠠᠨ
- Möllendorff: cikten gargan

The sexagenary cycle, liùshí huājiǎ (六十花甲), also known as the gānzhī (干支) or stems-and-branches, is a cycle of sixty terms used to designate successive years, historically used within Traditional Chinese Acupuncture, Herbology, Sociology and Psychology and publicly for recording of time in China and the rest of the East Asian cultural sphere, as well as in Southeast Asia.

Sexagenary cycle
01; Wood Rat	02; Wood Ox	03; Fire Tiger	04; Fire Rabbit	05; Earth Dragon	06; Earth Snake
07; Metal Horse	08; Metal Goat	09; Water Monkey	10; Water Rooster	11; Wood Dog	12; Wood Pig
13; Fire Rat	14; Fire Ox	15; Earth Tiger	16; Earth Rabbit	17; Metal Dragon	18; Metal Snake
19; Water Horse	20; Water Goat	21; Wood Monkey	22; Wood Rooster	23; Fire Dog	24; Fire Pig
25; Earth Rat	26; Earth Ox	27; Metal Tiger	28; Metal Rabbit	29; Water Dragon	30; Water Snake
31; Wood Horse	32; Wood Goat	33; Fire Monkey	34; Fire Rooster	35; Earth Dog	36; Earth Pig
37; Metal Rat	38; Metal Ox	39; Water Tiger	40; Water Rabbit	41; Wood Dragon	42; Wood Snake
43; Fire Horse	44; Fire Goat	45; Earth Monkey	46; Earth Rooster	47; Metal Dog	48; Metal Pig
49; Water Rat	50; Water Ox	51; Wood Tiger	52; Wood Rabbit	53; Fire Dragon	54; Fire Snake
55; Earth Horse	56; Earth Goat	57; Metal Monkey	58; Metal Rooster	59; Water Dog	60; Water Pig

Heavenly Stems ・ Earthly Branches

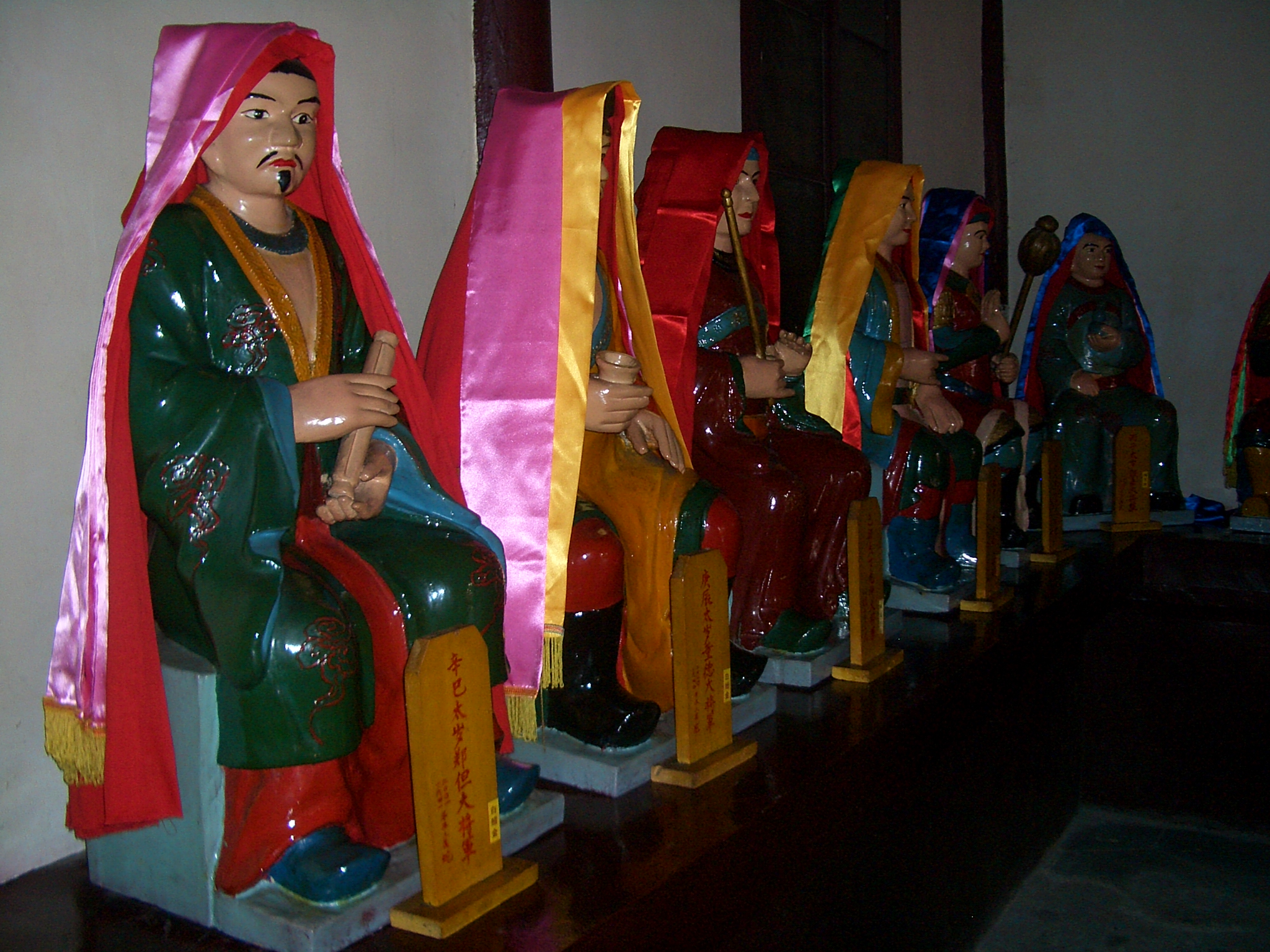
Statues of Tai Sui deities responsible for individual years of the sexagenary cycle

Each term in the sexagenary cycle consists of two Chinese characters, the first being one of the ten Heavenly Stems of the Shang-era week and the second being one of the twelve Earthly Branches representing the years of Jupiter's duodecennial orbital cycle. The first term jiǎzǐ (甲子) combines the first heavenly stem with the first earthly branch. The second term yǐchǒu (乙丑) combines the second stem with the second branch. This pattern continues until both cycles conclude simultaneously with guǐhài (癸亥), after which it begins again at jiǎzǐ. This termination at ten and twelve's least common multiple leaves half of the combinations—such as jiǎchǒu (甲丑)—unused; this is traditionally explained by reference to pairing the stems and branches according to their yin and yang properties.

It appeared as a means of recording days in the first Chinese written texts, the oracle bones of the late second millennium BC Shang dynasty. Its use to record years began around the middle of the 3rd century BC. The cycle and its variations have been an important part of the traditional calendrical systems in Chinese-influenced Asian states and territories, particularly those of Japan, Korea, and Vietnam, with the old Chinese system still in use in Taiwan, and in Mainland China.

This traditional method of numbering days and years no longer has any significant role in modern Chinese time-keeping or the official calendar. However, the sexagenary cycle is used in the names of many historical events, such as the Chinese Xinhai Revolution, the Japanese Boshin War, the Korean Imjin War and the Vietnamese Famine of Ất Dậu, Tết Mậu Thân. It also continues to have a role in contemporary Chinese astrology and fortune telling. There are some parallels in this with Tamil calendar.

This combination of two sub-cycles to generate a larger cycle and its use to record time have parallels in other calendrical systems, notably the Akan calendar.

== History ==
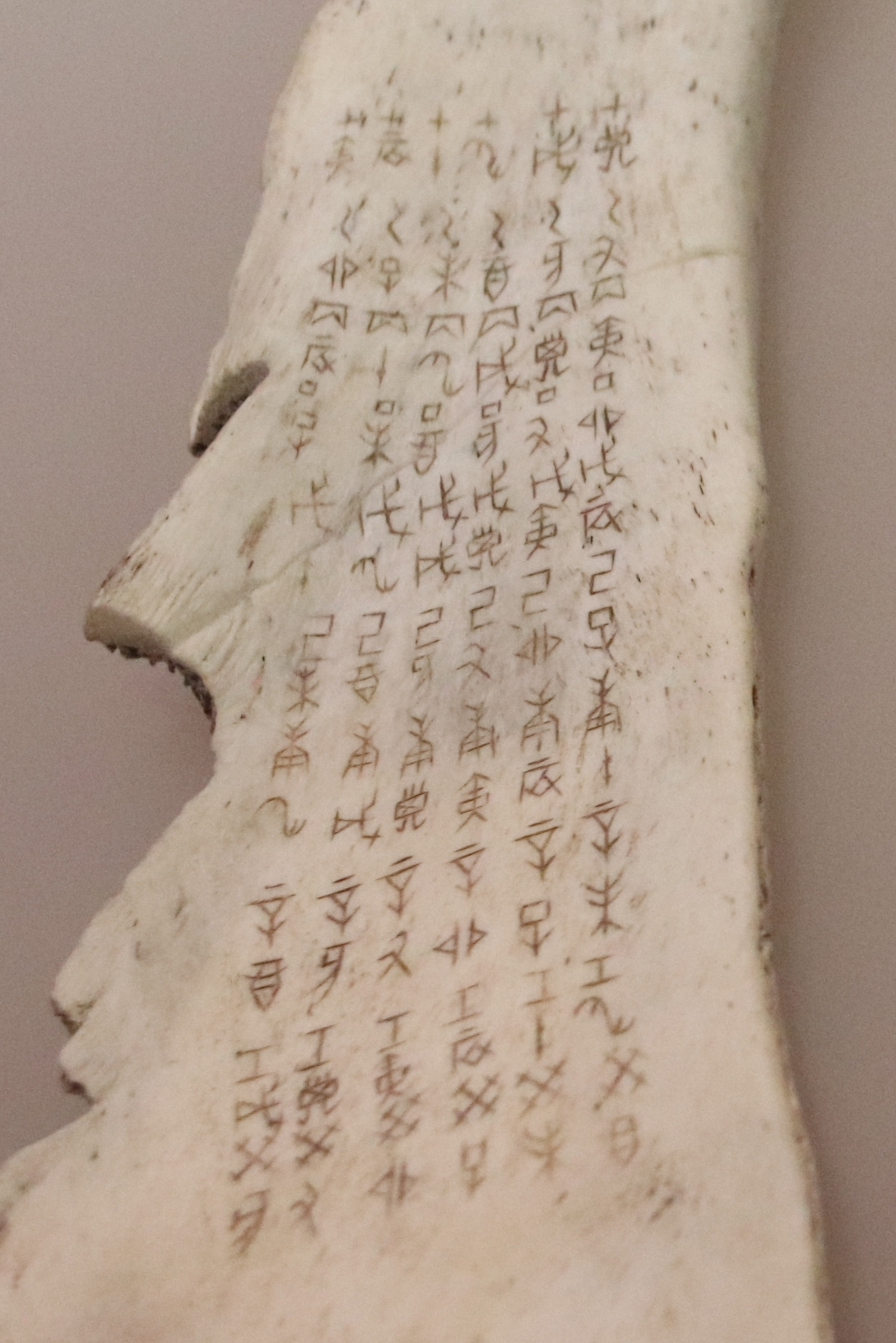
Bone inscribed with a table of the sexagenary cycle, dated to the early 11th century BC

The sexagenary cycle is attested as a method of recording days from the earliest written records in China, records of divination on oracle bones, beginning c. 1100 BC. Almost every oracle bone inscription includes a date in this format. This use of the cycle for days is attested throughout the Zhou dynasty and remained common into the Han period for all documentary purposes that required dates specified to the day.

Almost all the dates in the Spring and Autumn Annals, a chronological list of events from 722 to 481 BC, use this system in combination with regnal years and months (lunations) to record dates. Eclipses recorded in the Annals demonstrate that continuity in the sexagenary day-count was unbroken from that period onwards. It is likely that this unbroken continuity went back still further to the first appearance of the sexagenary cycle during the Shang period.

The use of the sexagenary cycle for recording years is much more recent. The earliest discovered documents showing this usage are among the silk manuscripts recovered from Mawangdui tomb 3, sealed in 168 BC. In one of these documents, a sexagenary grid diagram is annotated in three places to mark notable events. For example, the first year of the reign of Qin Shi Huang (秦始皇), 246 BC, is noted on the diagram next to the position of the 60-cycle term yǐmǎo (乙卯, 52 of 60), corresponding to that year. Use of the cycle to record years became widespread for administrative time-keeping during the Western Han dynasty (202 BC – 8 AD). The count of years has continued uninterrupted ever since: the year 1984 began the present cycle (a 甲子—jiǎzǐ year), and 2044 will begin another. Note that in China the new year, when the sexagenary count increments, is not January 1, but rather the lunar new year of the traditional Chinese calendar. For example, the jichou 己丑 year (coinciding roughly with 2009) began on January 26, 2009. (However, for astrology, the year begins with the first solar term Lìchūn (立春), which occurs near February 4.)

In Japan, according to Nihon shoki, the calendar was transmitted to Japan in 553. But it was not until the Suiko era that the calendar was used for politics. The year 604, when the Japanese officially adopted the Chinese calendar, was the first year of the cycle.

The Korean (환갑; 還甲; hwangap) and Japanese tradition (還暦 kanreki) of celebrating the 60th birthday (literally 'return of calendar') reflects the influence of the sexagenary cycle as a count of years.

The Tibetan calendar also counts years using a 60-year cycle based on 12 animals and 5 elements, but while the first year of the Chinese cycle is always jiǎzǐ (the year of the Wood Rat), the first year of the Tibetan cycle is dīngmǎo (丁卯; year 4 on the Chinese cycle, year of the Fire Rabbit).

== Heavenly Stems ==
No.	Heavenly Stem	Ahom Name	Chinese name				Japanese name		Korean name		Vietnamese name	Yin Yang	Wu Xing
No.	Heavenly Stem	Ahom Name	Mandarin (Pinyin)	Cantonese (Jyutping)	Middle Chinese (Baxter)	Old Chinese (Baxter–Sagart)	Onyomi	Kunyomi with corresponding kanji	Romanized	Hangul	Vietnamese name	Yin Yang	Wu Xing
1	甲	kap	jiǎ	gaap^{3}	kæp	*[k]ˤr[a]p	kō (こう)	kinoe (木の兄)	gap	갑	giáp	yang	wood
2	乙	dap	yǐ	jyut^{3}	ʔit	*qrət	otsu (おつ)	kinoto (木の弟)	eul	을	ất	yin	wood
3	丙	rai	bǐng	bing^{2}	pjæng^{X}	*praŋʔ	hei (へい)	hinoe (火の兄)	byeong	병	bính	yang	fire
4	丁	Mueang	dīng	ding^{1}	teng	*tˤeŋ	tei (てい)	hinoto (火の弟)	jeong	정	đinh	yin	fire
5	戊	plaek	wù	mou^{6}	muw^{H}	*m(r)uʔ-s (~ *m(r)uʔ)	bo (ぼ)	tsuchinoe (土の兄)	mu	무	mậu	yang	earth
6	己	kat	jǐ	gei^{2}	ki^{X}	*k(r)əʔ	ki (き)	tsuchinoto (土の弟)	gi	기	kỷ	yin	earth
7	庚	khut	gēng	gang^{1}	kæng	*kˤraŋ	kō (こう)	kanoe (金の兄)	gyeong	경	canh	yang	metal
8	辛	rung	xīn	san^{1}	sin	*si[n]	shin (しん)	kanoto (金の弟)	sin	신	tân	yin	metal
9	壬	tao	rén	jam^{4}	nyim	*n[ə]m	jin (じん)	mizunoe (水の兄)	im	임	nhâm	yang	water
10	癸	ka	guǐ	gwai^{3}	kjwij^{X}	*kʷijʔ	ki (き)	mizunoto (水の弟)	gye	계	quý	yin	water

== Earthly Branches ==
No.	Earthly Branch	Chinese name				Japanese name		Korean name		Vietnamese name	Vietnamese zodiac	Chinese zodiac	Corresponding hours
No.	Earthly Branch	Mandarin (Pinyin)	Cantonese (Jyutping)	Middle Chinese (Baxter)	Old Chinese (Baxter–Sagart)	Onyomi	Kunyomi	Romanized	Hangul	Vietnamese name	Vietnamese zodiac	Chinese zodiac	Corresponding hours
1	子	zǐ	zi^{2}	tsi^{X}	*[ts]əʔ	shi (し)	ne (ね)	ja	자	tý	Rat (chuột 𤝞)	Rat (鼠)	23:00–01:00
2	丑	chǒu	cau^{2}	trhjuw^{X}	*[n̥]ruʔ	chū (ちゅう)	ushi (うし)	chuk	축	sửu	Water buffalo (trâu 𤛠)	Ox (牛)	01:00–03:00
3	寅	yín	jan^{4}	yij	*[ɢ](r)ər	in (いん)	tora (とら)	in	인	dần	Tiger (hổ 虎/cọp 𧲫)	Tiger (虎)	03:00–05:00
4	卯	mǎo	maau^{5}	mæw^{X}	*mˤruʔ	bō (ぼう)	u (う)	myo	묘	mão/mẹo	Cat (mèo 猫)	Rabbit (兔)	05:00–07:00
5	辰	chén	san^{4}	dzyin	*[d]ər	shin (しん)	tatsu (たつ)	jin	진	thìn	Dragon (rồng 龍)	Dragon (龍)	07:00–09:00
6	巳	sì	zi^{6}	zi^{X}	*s-[ɢ]əʔ	shi (し)	mi (み)	sa	사	tỵ	Snake (rắn 𧋻)	Snake (蛇)	09:00–11:00
7	午	wǔ	ng^{5}	ngu^{X}	*[m].qʰˤaʔ	go (ご)	uma (うま)	o	오	ngọ	Horse (ngựa 馭)	Horse (馬)	11:00–13:00
8	未	wèi	mei^{6}	mjɨj^{H}	*m[ə]t-s	mi (み) or bi (び)	hitsuji (ひつじ)	mi	미	mùi	Goat (dê 羝)	Goat (羊)	13:00–15:00
9	申	shēn	san^{1}	syin	*l̥i[n]	shin (しん)	saru (さる)	sin	신	thân	Monkey (khỉ 𤠳)	Monkey (猴)	15:00–17:00
10	酉	yǒu	jau^{5}	yuw^{X}	*N-ruʔ	yū (ゆう)	tori (とり)	yu	유	dậu	Rooster (gà 𪂮)	Rooster (雞)	17:00–19:00
11	戌	xū	seot^{1}	swit	*s.mi[t]	jutsu (じゅつ)	inu (いぬ)	sul	술	tuất	Dog (chó 㹥)	Dog (狗)	19:00–21:00
12	亥	hài	hoi^{6}	hoj^{X}	*[g]ˤəʔ	gai (がい)	i (い)	hae	해	hợi	Pig (lợn 𤞼/heo 㺧)	Pig (豬)	21:00–23:00

*The names of several animals can be translated into English in several different ways. The Vietnamese Earthly Branches use cat instead of Rabbit.

== Sexagenary years ==
No.	Stem-Branch	Mandarin Chinese Pinyin	Japanese	Korean	Vietnamese	Associations	BC	AD	Current Cycle
1	甲子	jiǎzǐ	kōshi; kasshi; kinoe-ne	gapja 갑자	Giáp Tý	Yang Wood Rat	57	4	1984
2	乙丑	yǐchǒu	itchū; kinoto-ushi	eulchuk 을축	Ất Sửu	Yin Wood Ox	56	5	1985
3	丙寅	bǐngyín	heiin; hinoe-tora	byeongin 병인	Bính Dần	Yang Fire Tiger	55	6	1986
4	丁卯	dīngmǎo	teibō; hinoto-u	jeongmyo 정묘	Đinh Mão	Yin Fire Rabbit	54	7	1987
5	戊辰	wùchén	boshin; tsuchinoe-tatsu	mujin 무진	Mậu Thìn	Yang Earth Dragon	53	8	1988
6	己巳	jǐsì	kishi; tsuchinoto-mi	gisa 기사	Kỷ Tỵ	Yin Earth Snake	52	9	1989
7	庚午	gēngwǔ	kōgo; kanoe-uma	gyeongo 경오	Canh Ngọ	Yang Metal Horse	51	10	1990
8	辛未	xīnwèi	shinbi; kanoto-hitsuji	sinmi 신미	Tân Mùi	Yin Metal Goat	50	11	1991
9	壬申	rénshēn	jinshin; mizunoe-saru	imsin 임신	Nhâm Thân	Yang Water Monkey	49	12	1992
10	癸酉	guǐyǒu	kiyū; mizunoto-tori	gyeyu 계유	Quý Dậu	Yin Water Rooster	48	13	1993
11	甲戌	jiǎxū	kōjutsu; kinoe-inu	gapsul 갑술	Giáp Tuất	Yang Wood Dog	47	14	1994
12	乙亥	yǐhài	itsugai; kinoto-i	eulhae 을해	Ât Hợi	Yin Wood Pig	46	15	1995
13	丙子	bǐngzǐ	heishi; hinoe-ne	byeongja 병자	Bính Tý	Yang Fire Rat	45	16	1996
14	丁丑	dīngchǒu	teichū; hinoto-ushi	jeongchuk 정축	Đinh Sửu	Yin Fire Ox	44	17	1997
15	戊寅	wùyín	boin; tsuchinoe-tora	muin 무인	Mậu Dần	Yang Earth Tiger	43	18	1998
16	己卯	jǐmǎo	kibō; tsuchinoto-u	gimyo 기묘	Kỷ Mão	Yin Earth Rabbit	42	19	1999
17	庚辰	gēngchén	kōshin; kanoe-tatsu	gyeongjin 경진	Canh Thìn	Yang Metal Dragon	41	20	2000
18	辛巳	xīnsì	shinshi; kanoto-mi	sinsa 신사	Tân Tỵ	Yin Metal Snake	40	21	2001
19	壬午	rénwǔ	jingo; mizunoe-uma	imo 임오	Nhâm Ngọ	Yang Water Horse	39	22	2002
20	癸未	guǐwèi	kibi; mizunoto-hitsuji	gyemi 계미	Quý Mùi	Yin Water Goat	38	23	2003
21	甲申	jiǎshēn	kōshin; kinoe-saru	gapsin 갑신	Giáp Thân	Yang Wood Monkey	37	24	2004
22	乙酉	yǐyǒu	itsuyū; kinoto-tori	euryu 을유	Ất Dậu	Yin Wood Rooster	36	25	2005
23	丙戌	bǐngxū	heijutsu; hinoe-inu	byeongsul 병술	Bính Tuất	Yang Fire Dog	35	26	2006
24	丁亥	dīnghài	teigai; hinoto-i	jeonghae 정해	Đinh Hợi	Yin Fire Pig	34	27	2007
25	戊子	wùzǐ	boshi; tsuchinoe-ne	muja 무자	Mậu Tý	Yang Earth Rat	33	28	2008
26	己丑	jǐchǒu	kichū; tsuchinoto-ushi	gichuk 기축	Kỷ Sửu	Yin Earth Ox	32	29	2009
27	庚寅	gēngyín	kōin; kanoe-tora	gyeongin 경인	Canh Dần	Yang Metal Tiger	31	30	2010
28	辛卯	xīnmǎo	shinbō; kanoto-u	sinmyo 신묘	Tân Mão	Yin Metal Rabbit	30	31	2011
29	壬辰	rénchén	jinshin; mizunoe-tatsu	imjin 임진	Nhâm Thìn	Yang Water Dragon	29	32	2012
30	癸巳	guǐsì	kishi; mizunoto-mi	gyesa 계사	Quý Tỵ	Yin Water Snake	28	33	2013
31	甲午	jiǎwǔ	kōgo; kinoe-uma	gabo 갑오	Giáp Ngọ	Yang Wood Horse	27	34	2014
32	乙未	yǐwèi	itsubi; kinoto-hitsuji	eulmi 을미	Ất Mùi	Yin Wood Goat	26	35	2015
33	丙申	bǐngshēn	heishin; hinoe-saru	byeongsin 병신	Bính Thân	Yang Fire Monkey	25	36	2016
34	丁酉	dīngyǒu	teiyū; hinoto-tori	jeongyu 정유	Đinh Dậu	Yin Fire Rooster	24	37	2017
35	戊戌	wùxū	bojutsu; tsuchinoe-inu	musul 무술	Mậu Tuất	Yang Earth Dog	23	38	2018
36	己亥	jǐhài	kigai; tsuchinoto-i	gihae 기해	Kỷ Hợi	Yin Earth Pig	22	39	2019
37	庚子	gēngzǐ	kōshi; kanoe-ne	gyeongja 경자	Canh Tý	Yang Metal Rat	21	40	2020
38	辛丑	xīnchǒu	shinchū; kanoto-ushi	sinchuk 신축	Tân Sửu	Yin Metal Ox	20	41	2021
39	壬寅	rényín	jin'in; mizunoe-tora	imin 임인	Nhâm Dần	Yang Water Tiger	19	42	2022
40	癸卯	guǐmǎo	kibō; mizunoto-u	gyemyo 계묘	Quý Mão	Yin Water Rabbit	18	43	2023
41	甲辰	jiǎchén	kōshin; kinoe-tatsu	gapjin 갑진	Giáp Thìn	Yang Wood Dragon	17	44	2024
42	乙巳	yǐsì	itsushi; kinoto-mi	eulsa 을사	Ất Tỵ	Yin Wood Snake	16	45	2025
43	丙午	bǐngwǔ	heigo; hinoe-uma	byeongo 병오	Bính Ngọ	Yang Fire Horse	15	46	2026
44	丁未	dīngwèi	teibi; hinoto-hitsuji	jeongmi 정미	Đinh Mùi	Yin Fire Goat	14	47	2027
45	戊申	wùshēn	boshin; tsuchinoe-saru	musin 무신	Mậu Thân	Yang Earth Monkey	13	48	2028
46	己酉	jǐyǒu	kiyū; tsuchinoto-tori	giyu 기유	Kỷ Dậu	Yin Earth Rooster	12	49	2029
47	庚戌	gēngxū	kōjutsu; kanoe-inu	gyeongsul 경술	Canh Tuất	Yang Metal Dog	11	50	2030
48	辛亥	xīnhài	shingai; kanoto-i	sinhae 신해	Tân Hợi	Yin Metal Pig	10	51	2031
49	壬子	rénzǐ	jinshi; mizunoe-ne	imja 임자	Nhâm Tý	Yang Water Rat	9	52	2032
50	癸丑	guǐchǒu	kichū; mizunoto-ushi	gyechuk 계축	Quý Sửu	Yin Water Ox	8	53	2033
51	甲寅	jiǎyín	kōin; kinoe-tora	gabin 갑인	Giáp Dần	Yang Wood Tiger	7	54	2034
52	乙卯	yǐmǎo	itsubō; kinoto-u	eulmyo 을묘	Ất Mão	Yin Wood Rabbit	6	55	2035
53	丙辰	bǐngchén	heishin; hinoe-tatsu	byeongjin 병진	Bính Thìn	Yang Fire Dragon	5	56	2036
54	丁巳	dīngsì	teishi; hinoto-mi	jeongsa 정사	Đinh Tỵ	Yin Fire Snake	4	57	2037
55	戊午	wùwǔ	bogo; tsuchinoe-uma	muo 무오	Mậu Ngọ	Yang Earth Horse	3	58	2038
56	己未	jǐwèi	kibi; tsuchinoto-hitsuji	gimi 기미	Kỷ Mùi	Yin Earth Goat	2	59	2039
57	庚申	gēngshēn	kōshin; kanoe-saru	gyeongsin 경신	Canh Thân	Yang Metal Monkey	1	60	2040
58	辛酉	xīnyǒu	shin'yū; kanoto-tori	sinyu 신유	Tân Dậu	Yin Metal Rooster	60	1	2041
59	壬戌	rénxū	jinjutsu; mizunoe-inu	imsul 임술	Nhâm Tuất	Yang Water Dog	59	2	2042
60	癸亥	guǐhài	kigai; mizunoto-i	gyehae 계해	Quý Hợi	Yin Water Pig	58	3	2043

24 cardinal directions

== Conversion between cyclic years and Western years ==
Relationship between sexagenary cycle and recent Common Era years

As mentioned above, the cycle first started to be used for indicating years during the Han dynasty, but it also can be used to indicate earlier years retroactively. Since it repeats, by itself it cannot specify a year without some other information, but it is frequently used with the Chinese era name (年号, 年號; niánhào) to specify a year. The year starts with the new year of whoever is using the calendar. In China, the cyclic year normally changes on the Chinese Lunar New Year. In Japan until recently it was the Japanese lunar new year, which was sometimes different from the Chinese; now it is January 1. So when calculating the cyclic year of a date in the Gregorian year, one has to consider what their "new year" is. Hence, the following calculation deals with the Chinese dates after the Lunar New Year in that Gregorian year; to find the corresponding sexagenary year in the dates before the Lunar New Year would require the Gregorian year to be decreased by 1.

As for example, the year 2697 BC (or −2696, using the astronomical year numbering), traditionally the first year of the reign of the legendary Yellow Emperor, was the first year (甲子; jiǎzǐ) of a cycle. 2700 years later in 4 AD, the duration equivalent to 45 60-year cycles, was also the starting year of a 60-year cycle. Similarly 1980 years later, 1984 was the start of a new cycle.

Thus, to find out the Gregorian year's equivalent in the sexagenary cycle use the appropriate method below.

1. For any year number greater than 4 AD, the equivalent sexagenary year can be found by subtracting 3 from the Gregorian year, dividing by 60 and taking the remainder. See example below.
2. For any year before 1 AD, the equivalent sexagenary year can be found by adding 2 to the Gregorian year number (in BC), dividing it by 60, and subtracting the remainder from 60.
3. 1 AD, 2 AD and 3 AD correspond respectively to the 58th, 59th and 60th years of the sexagenary cycle.
4. The formula for years AD is (year – 3) mod 60 and for years BC is 60 − [(year + 2) mod 60].

The result will produce a number between 0 and 59, corresponding to the year order in the cycle; if the remainder is 0, it corresponds to the 60th year of a cycle. Thus, using the first method, the equivalent sexagenary year for 2012 AD is the 29th year (壬辰; rénchén), as (2012–3) mod 60 = 29 (i.e., the remainder of (2012–3) divided by 60 is 29). Using the second, the equivalent sexagenary year for 221 BC is the 17th year (庚辰; gēngchén), as 60 − [(221+2) mod 60] = 17 (i.e., 60 minus the remainder of (221+2) divided by 60 is 17).

=== Examples ===
Step-by-step example to determine the sign for 1967:

1. 1967 – 3 = 1964 ("subtracting 3 from the Gregorian year")
2. ⌊1964 ÷ 60⌋ = 32 ("divide by 60 and discard any fraction")
3. 1964 – (60 × 32) = 44 ("taking the remainder")
4. Show one of the Sexagenary Cycle tables (the following section), look for 44 in the first column (No) and obtain Fire Goat (丁未; dīngwèi).

Step-by-step example to determine the cyclic year of first year of the reign of Qin Shi Huang (246 BC):

1. 246 + 2 = 248 ("adding 2 to the Gregorian year number (in BC)")
2. ⌊248 ÷ 60⌋ = 4 ("divide by 60 and discard any fraction")
3. 248 – (60 × 4) = 8 ("taking the remainder")
4. 60 – 8 = 52 ("subtract the remainder from 60")
5. Show one of the Sexagenary Cycle table (the following section), look for 52 in the first column (No) and obtain Wood Rabbit (乙卯; yǐmǎo).

=== Equivalent lookup method ===
Start from the AD year (1967), take directly the remainder mod 60, and look into column AD of the table "Sexagenary years" (just above).

1. 1967 = 60 × 32 + 47.
2. Remainder is therefore 47 and the AD column says 'Fire Goat' as it should be.

For a BC year: take the remainder of the year mod 60 and look into column BC. Applied to year 246 BC, this gives:

1. 246 = 60 × 4 + 6.
2. Remainder is therefore 6 and the BC column of table "Sexagenary years" (just above) gives 'Wood Rabbit'.

When doing these conversions, year 246 BC may be treated as −245 AD as in astronomical year numbering, but never as −246 AD, due to the lack of a year 0 in the Gregorian AD/BC system.

=== Recent cycles ===
Recent years (in the Gregorian calendar) and their corresponding years in the cycles
No.	Heavenly stem	Earthly branch	New Year Day			
No.	(Element)	(Animal)	76th cycle	77th cycle	78th cycle	79th cycle
01	甲 Yang Wood	子 Rat	11 Feb 1804	08 Feb 1864	05 Feb 1924	02 Feb 1984
02	乙 Yin Wood	丑 Ox	31 Jan 1805	27 Jan 1865	24 Jan 1925	20 Feb 1985
03	丙 Yang Fire	寅 Tiger	18 Feb 1806	15 Feb 1866	13 Feb 1926	09 Feb 1986
04	丁 Yin Fire	卯 Rabbit	07 Feb 1807	05 Feb 1867	02 Feb 1927	30 Jan 1987
05	戊 Yang Earth	辰 Dragon	28 Jan 1808	25 Jan 1868	23 Jan 1928	18 Feb 1988
06	己 Yin Earth	巳 Snake	15 Feb 1809	11 Feb 1869	10 Feb 1929	06 Feb 1989
07	庚 Yang Metal	午 Horse	04 Feb 1810	01 Feb 1870	30 Jan 1930	27 Jan 1990
08	辛 Yin Metal	未 Goat	25 Jan 1811	20 Feb 1871	17 Feb 1931	15 Feb 1991
09	壬 Yang Water	申 Monkey	13 Feb 1812	09 Feb 1872	07 Feb 1932	04 Feb 1992
10	癸 Yin Water	酉 Rooster	01 Feb 1813	29 Jan 1873	26 Jan 1933	23 Jan 1993
11	甲 Yang Wood	戌 Dog	21 Jan 1814	17 Feb 1874	14 Feb 1934	11 Feb 1994
12	乙 Yin Wood	亥 Pig	09 Feb 1815	06 Feb 1875	04 Feb 1935	31 Jan 1995
13	丙 Yang Fire	子 Rat	29 Jan 1816	26 Jan 1876	24 Jan 1936	19 Feb 1996
14	丁 Yin Fire	丑 Ox	16 Feb 1817	13 Feb 1877	11 Feb 1937	07 Feb 1997
15	戊 Yang Earth	寅 Tiger	06 Feb 1818	02 Feb 1878	31 Jan 1938	28 Jan 1998
16	己 Yin Earth	卯 Rabbit	26 Jan 1819	23 Jan 1879	19 Feb 1939	16 Feb 1999
17	庚 Yang Metal	辰 Dragon	14 Feb 1820	10 Feb 1880	08 Feb 1940	05 Feb 2000
18	辛 Yin Metal	巳 Snake	03 Feb 1821	30 Jan 1881	27 Jan 1941	24 Jan 2001
19	壬 Yang Water	午 Horse	23 Jan 1822	18 Feb 1882	15 Feb 1942	12 Feb 2002
20	癸 Yin Water	未 Goat	11 Feb 1823	08 Feb 1883	05 Feb 1943	01 Feb 2003
21	甲 Yang Wood	申 Monkey	31 Jan 1824	28 Jan 1884	25 Jan 1944	22 Jan 2004
22	乙 Yin Wood	酉 Rooster	18 Feb 1825	15 Feb 1885	13 Feb 1945	09 Feb 2005
23	丙 Yang Fire	戌 Dog	07 Feb 1826	04 Feb 1886	02 Feb 1946	30 Jan 2006
24	丁 Yin Fire	亥 Pig	27 Jan 1827	24 Jan 1887	22 Jan 1947	18 Feb 2007
25	戊 Yang Earth	子 Rat	16 Feb 1828	12 Feb 1888	10 Feb 1948	07 Feb 2008
26	己 Yin Earth	丑 Ox	04 Feb 1829	31 Jan 1889	29 Jan 1949	26 Jan 2009
27	庚 Yang Metal	寅 Tiger	25 Jan 1830	21 Jan 1890	17 Feb 1950	14 Feb 2010
28	辛 Yin Metal	卯 Rabbit	13 Feb 1831	09 Feb 1891	06 Feb 1951	03 Feb 2011
29	壬 Yang Water	辰 Dragon	02 Feb 1832	30 Jan 1892	27 Jan 1952	23 Jan 2012
30	癸 Yin Water	巳 Snake	20 Feb 1833	17 Feb 1893	14 Feb 1953	10 Feb 2013
31	甲 Yang Wood	午 Horse	09 Feb 1834	06 Feb 1894	04 Feb 1954	31 Jan 2014
32	乙 Yin Wood	未 Goat	29 Jan 1835	26 Jan 1895	24 Jan 1955	19 Feb 2015
33	丙 Yang Fire	申 Monkey	17 Feb 1836	13 Feb 1896	12 Feb 1956	08 Feb 2016
34	丁 Yin Fire	酉 Rooster	06 Feb 1837	02 Feb 1897	31 Jan 1957	28 Jan 2017
35	戊 Yang Earth	戌 Dog	26 Jan 1838	22 Jan 1898	19 Feb 1958	16 Feb 2018
36	己 Yin Earth	亥 Pig	14 Feb 1839	10 Feb 1899	08 Feb 1959	05 Feb 2019
37	庚 Yang Metal	子 Rat	03 Feb 1840	31 Jan 1900	28 Jan 1960	25 Jan 2020
38	辛 Yin Metal	丑 Ox	23 Jan 1841	19 Feb 1901	15 Feb 1961	12 Feb 2021
39	壬 Yang Water	寅 Tiger	10 Feb 1842	08 Feb 1902	05 Feb 1962	01 Feb 2022
40	癸 Yin Water	卯 Rabbit	30 Jan 1843	29 Jan 1903	26 Jan 1963	22 Jan 2023
41	甲 Yang Wood	辰 Dragon	18 Feb 1844	16 Feb 1904	13 Feb 1964	10 Feb 2024
42	乙 Yin Wood	巳 Snake	07 Feb 1845	04 Feb 1905	02 Feb 1965	29 Jan 2025
43	丙 Yang Fire	午 Horse	27 Jan 1846	25 Jan 1906	22 Jan 1966	17 Feb 2026
44	丁 Yin Fire	未 Goat	16 Feb 1847	13 Feb 1907	09 Feb 1967	06 Feb 2027
45	戊 Yang Earth	申 Monkey	05 Feb 1848	02 Feb 1908	30 Jan 1968	26 Jan 2028
46	己 Yin Earth	酉 Rooster	24 Jan 1849	22 Jan 1909	17 Feb 1969	13 Feb 2029
47	庚 Yang Metal	戌 Dog	12 Feb 1850	10 Feb 1910	06 Feb 1970	03 Feb 2030
48	辛 Yin Metal	亥 Pig	01 Feb 1851	30 Jan 1911	27 Jan 1971	23 Jan 2031
49	壬 Yang Water	子 Rat	20 Feb 1852	18 Feb 1912	15 Feb 1972	11 Feb 2032
50	癸 Yin Water	丑 Ox	08 Feb 1853	06 Feb 1913	03 Feb 1973	31 Jan 2033
51	甲 Yang Wood	寅 Tiger	29 Jan 1854	26 Jan 1914	23 Jan 1974	19 Feb 2034
52	乙 Yin Wood	卯 Rabbit	17 Feb 1855	14 Feb 1915	11 Feb 1975	08 Feb 2035
53	丙 Yang Fire	辰 Dragon	07 Feb 1856	03 Feb 1916	31 Jan 1976	28 Jan 2036
54	丁 Yin Fire	巳 Snake	26 Jan 1857	23 Jan 1917	18 Feb 1977	15 Feb 2037
55	戊 Yang Earth	午 Horse	14 Feb 1858	11 Feb 1918	07 Feb 1978	04 Feb 2038
56	己 Yin Earth	未 Goat	03 Feb 1859	01 Feb 1919	28 Jan 1979	24 Jan 2039
57	庚 Yang Metal	申 Monkey	23 Jan 1860	20 Feb 1920	16 Feb 1980	12 Feb 2040
58	辛 Yin Metal	酉 Rooster	10 Feb 1861	08 Feb 1921	05 Feb 1981	01 Feb 2041
59	壬 Yang Water	戌 Dog	30 Jan 1862	28 Jan 1922	25 Jan 1982	22 Jan 2042
60	癸 Yin Water	亥 Pig	18 Feb 1863	16 Feb 1923	13 Feb 1983	10 Feb 2043

== Sexagenary months ==
The branches are used marginally to indicate months. Despite there being twelve branches and twelve months in a year, the earliest use of branches to indicate a twelve-fold division of a year was in the 2nd century BC. They were coordinated with the orientations of the Big Dipper, (建子月: jiànzǐyuè, 建丑月: jiànchǒuyuè, etc.). There are two systems of placing these months, the lunar one and the solar one.

One system follows the ordinary Chinese lunar calendar and connects the names of the months directly to the central solar term (中氣; zhōngqì). The jiànzǐyuè ((建)子月) is the month containing the winter solstice (i.e. the 冬至 Dōngzhì) zhōngqì. The jiànchǒuyuè ((建)丑月) is the month of the following zhōngqì, which is Dàhán (大寒), while the jiànyínyuè ((建)寅月) is that of the Yǔshuǐ (雨水) zhōngqì, etc. Intercalary months have the same branch as the preceding month.

In the other system (節月; jiéyuè) the "month" lasts for the period of two solar terms (two 氣策 qìcì). The zǐyuè (子月) is the period starting with Dàxuě (大雪), i.e. the solar term before the winter solstice. The chǒuyuè (丑月) starts with Xiǎohán (小寒), the term before Dàhán (大寒), while the yínyuè (寅月) starts with Lìchūn (立春), the term before Yǔshuǐ (雨水), etc. Thus in the solar system a month starts anywhere from about 15 days before to 15 days after its lunar counterpart.

The branch names are not usual month names; the main use of the branches for months is astrological. However, the names are sometimes used to indicate historically which (lunar) month was the first month of the year in ancient times. For example, since the Han dynasty, the first month has been jiànyínyuè, but earlier the first month was jiànzǐyuè (during the Zhou dynasty) or jiànchǒuyuè (traditionally during the Shang dynasty) as well.

For astrological purposes stems are also necessary, and the months are named using the sexagenary cycle following a five-year cycle starting in a jiǎ (甲; 1st) or jǐ (己; 6th) year. The first month of the jiǎ or jǐ year is a bǐngyín (丙寅; 3rd) month, the next one is a dīngmǎo (丁卯; 4th) month, etc., and the last month of the year is a dīngchǒu (丁丑, 14th) month. The next year will start with a wùyín (戊寅; 15th) month, etc. following the cycle. The 5th year will end with a yǐchǒu (乙丑; 2nd) month. The following month, the start of a jǐ or jiǎ year, will hence again be a bǐngyín (3rd) month again. The beginning and end of the (solar) months in the table below are the approximate dates of current solar terms; they vary slightly from year to year depending on the leap days of the Gregorian calendar.

Earthly Branches of the certain months	Solar term	Zhongqi (the Middle solar term)	Starts at	Ends at	Names in year of Jia or Ji (甲/己年)	Names in year of Yi or Geng (乙/庚年)	Names in year of Bing or Xin (丙/辛年)	Names in year of Ding or Ren (丁/壬年)	Names in year of Wu or Gui (戊/癸年)
Month of Yin (寅月)	Lichun – Jingzhe	Yushui / 雨水	February 4	March 6	Bingyin / 丙寅月	Wuyin / 戊寅月	Gengyin / 庚寅月	Renyin / 壬寅月	Jiayin / 甲寅月
Month of Mao (卯月)	Jingzhe – Qingming	Chunfen / 春分	March 6	April 5	Dingmao / 丁卯月	Jimao / 己卯月	Xinmao / 辛卯月	Guimao / 癸卯月	Yimao / 乙卯月
Month of Chen (辰月)	Qingming – Lixia	Guyu / 谷雨	April 5	May 6	Wuchen / 戊辰月	Gengchen / 庚辰月	Renchen / 壬辰月	Jiachen / 甲辰月	Bingchen / 丙辰月
Month of Si (巳月)	Lixia – Mangzhong	Xiaoman / 小满	May 6	June 6	Jisi / 己巳月	Xinsi / 辛巳月	Guisi / 癸巳月	Yisi / 乙巳月	Dingsi / 丁巳月
Month of Wu (午月)	Mangzhong – Xiaoshu	Xiazhi / 夏至	June 6	July 7	Gengwu / 庚午月	Renwu / 壬午月	Jiawu / 甲午月	Bingwu / 丙午月	Wuwu / 戊午月
Month of Wei (未月)	Xiaoshu – Liqiu	Dashu / 大暑	July 7	August 8	Xinwei / 辛未月	Guiwei / 癸未月	Yiwei / 乙未月	Dingwei / 丁未月	Jiwei / 己未月
Month of Shen (申月)	Liqiu – Bailu	Chushu / 处暑	August 8	September 8	Renshen / 壬申月	Jiashen / 甲申月	Bingshen / 丙申月	Wushen / 戊申月	Gengshen / 庚申月
Month of You (酉月)	Bailu – Hanlu	Qiufen / 秋分	September 8	October 8	Guiyou / 癸酉月	Yiyou / 乙酉月	Dingyou / 丁酉月	Jiyou / 己酉月	Xinyou / 辛酉月
Month of Xu (戌月)	Hanlu – Lidong	Shuangjiang / 霜降	October 8	November 7	Jiaxu / 甲戌月	Bingxu / 丙戌月	Wuxu / 戊戌月	Gengxu / 庚戌月	Renxu / 壬戌月
Month of Hai (亥月)	Lidong – Daxue	Xiaoxue / 小雪	November 7	December 7	Yihai / 乙亥月	Dinghai / 丁亥月	Jihai / 己亥月	Xinhai / 辛亥月	Guihai / 癸亥月
Month of Zi (子月)	Daxue – Xiaohan	Dongzhi / 冬至	December 7	January 6	Bingzi / 丙子月	Wuzi / 戊子月	Gengzi / 庚子月	Renzi / 壬子月	Jiazi / 甲子月
Month of Chou (丑月)	Xiaohan – Lichun	Dahan / 大寒	January 6	February 4	Dingchou / 丁丑月	Jichou / 己丑月	Xinchou / 辛丑月	Guichou / 癸丑月	Yichou / 乙丑月

== Sexagenary days ==
Table for sexagenary days
Day (stem)				Month (stem)				2-digit year mod 40 (stem)				Century (stem)					N	Century (branch)					2-digit year mod 16 (branch)							Month (branch)				Day (branch)		
Day (stem)				Month (stem)				2-digit year mod 40 (stem)				Julian mod 2	Gregorian				N	Julian mod 4	Gregorian				2-digit year mod 16 (branch)							Month (branch)				Day (branch)		
00	10	20	30	Aug				00	02	21	23	00	16				00	00					00			07							Nov	00	12	24
01	11	21	31	Sep	Oct			04	06	25	27				21		01												14					01	13	25
02	12	22		Nov	Dec			08	10	29	31			19			02		16	19					05					Feb	Apr			02	14	26
03	13	23						12	14	33	35						03	03			22			03				12		Feb	Jun			03	15	27
04	14	24						16	18	37	39		17			24	04										10					Aug		04	16	28
05	15	25						01	03	20	22	01			22	15	05		15				01										Oct	05	17	29
06	16	26						05	07	24	26						06	02		18						08			15				Dec	06	18	30
07	17	27			Mar		Jan	09	11	28	30			20			07				21				06					Jan	Mar			07	19	31
08	18	28		Jan	Apr	May	Feb	13	15	32	34		18				08					24						13		Jan	May			08	20	
09	19	29		Feb	Jun	Jul		17	19	36	38				23		09	01						04			11					Jul		09	21	
Dates with yellow background indicate they are for this year.																	10		17				02											10	22	
Dates with yellow background indicate they are for this year.																	11				20	23				09						Sep		11	23	

- N for the year: (5y + [y/4]) mod 10, y = 0–39 (stem); (5y + [y/4]) mod 12, y = 0–15 (branch)
- N for the Gregorian century: (4c + [c/4] + 2) mod 10 (stem); (8c + [c/4] + 2) mod 12 (branch), c ≥ 15
- N for the Julian century: 5c mod 10, c = 0–1 (stem); 9c mod 12, c = 0–3 (branch)

The table above allows one to find the stem & branch for any given date. For both the stem and the branch, find the N for the row for the century, year, month, and day, then add them together. If the sum for the stems' N is above 10, subtract 10 until the result is between 1 and 10. If the sum for the branches' N is above 12, subtract 12 until the result is between 1 and 12.

For any date before October 15, 1582, use the Julian century column to find the row for that century's N. For dates after October 15, 1582, use the Gregorian century column to find the century's N. When looking at dates in January and February of leap years, use the bold & italic Feb and Jan.

=== Examples ===
- Step-by-step example to determine the stem-branch for October 1, 1949.
  - Stem
    - (day stem N + month stem N + year stem N + century stem N) = number of stem. If over 10, subtract 10 until within 1 – 10.
      - Day 1: N = 1,
      - Month of October: N = 1,
      - Year 49: N = 7,
        - 49 isn't on the table, so we'll have to mod 49 by 40. This gives us year 9, which we can follow to find the N for that row.
      - Century 19: N = 2.
    - (1 + 1 + 7 + 2) = 11. This is more than 10, so we'll subtract 10 to bring it between 1 and 10.
      - 11 – 10 = 1,
      - Stem = 1, 甲.
  - Branch
    - (day branch N + month branch N + year branch N + century branch N)= number of branch. If over 12, subtract 12 until within 1 – 12.
      - Day 1: N = 1,
      - Month of October: N = 5,
      - Year 49: N = 5,
        - Again, 49 is not in the table for year. Modding 49 by 16 gives us 1, which we can look up to find the N of that row.
      - Century 19: N = 2.
    - (1 + 5 + 5 + 2) = 13. Since 13 is more than 12, we'll subtract 12 to bring it between 1 and 12.
      - 13 – 12 = 1,
      - Branch = 1, 子.
  - Stem-branch = 1, 1 (甲子, 1 in sexagenary cycle = 32 – 5 + 33 + 1 – 60).

More detailed examples
- Stem-branch for December 31, 1592
  - Stem = (day stem N + month stem N + year stem N + century stem N)
    - Day 31: N = 1; month of December: N = 2; year 92 (92 mod 40 = 12): N = 3; century 15: N = 5.
    - (1 + 2 + 3 + 5) = 11; 11 – 10 = 1.
    - Stem = 1, 甲.
  - Branch = (day branch N + month branch N + year branch N + century branch N)
    - Day 31: N = 7; month of December: N = 6; year 92 (92 mod 16 = 12): N = 3; century 15: N = 5.
    - (7 + 6 + 3 + 5) = 21; 21 – 12 = 9.
    - Branch = 9, 申
  - Stem-branch = 1, 9 (甲申, 21 in cycle = – 42 – 2 + 34 + 31 = 21)
- Stem-branch for August 4, 1338
  - Stem = 8, 辛
    - Day 4: N = 4; month of August: N = 0; year 38: N = 9; century 13 (13 mod 2 = 1): N = 5.
    - (4 + 0 + 9 + 5) = 18; 18 – 10 = 8.
  - Branch = 12, 亥
    - Day 4: N = 4; month of August: N = 4; year 38 (38 mod 16 = 6): N = 7; century 13 (13 mod 4 = 1): N = 9.
    - (4 + 4 + 7 + 9) = 24; 24 – 12 = 12
  - Stem-branch = 8, 12 (辛亥, 48 in cycle = 4 + 8 + 32 + 4)
- Stem-branch for May 25, 105 BC (−104).
  - Stem = 7, 庚
    - Day 25: N = 5; month of May: N = 8; year −4 (−4 mod 40 = 36): N = 9; century −1 (−1 mod 2 = 1): N = 5.
    - (5 + 8 + 9 + 5) = 27; 27 – 10 = 17; 17 – 10 = 7.
  - Branch = 3, 寅
    - Day 25: N = 1; month of May: N = 8; year −4 (−4 mod 16 = 12): N = 3; century −1 (−1 mod 4 = 3): N = 3.
    - (1 + 8 + 3 + 3) = 15; 15 – 12 = 3.
  - Stem-branch = 7, 3 (庚寅, 27 in cycle = – 6 + 8 + 0 + 25)
  - Alternately, instead of doing both century and year, one can exclude the century and simply use −104 as the year for both the stem and the branch to get the same result.

Algorithm for mental calculation

$$SB = (y + c + m + day) \bmod 60$$
$$S = SB \bmod 10, B = SB \bmod 12$$
$$y = (year(\bmod 400) \bmod 80 (\bmod 12) \times 5 + \left\lfloor\frac{year(\bmod 400) \bmod 80}{4}\right\rfloor) \bmod 60$$
$c = \left\lfloor\frac{year}{400}\right\rfloor - \left\lfloor\frac{year}{100}\right\rfloor + 10$ for Gregorian calendar and $c = 8$ for Julian calendar.
$m =(month + 1)\bmod 2\times 30+\left\lfloor{0.6\times (month + 1) - 3}\right\rfloor - i$
$i = 5$ for Jan or Feb in a common year and $i = 6$ in a leap year.

Month	Jan; 13	Feb; 14	Mar; 03	Apr; 04	May; 05	Jun; 06	Jul; 07	Aug; 08	Sep; 09	Oct; 10	Nov; 11	Dec; 12
m	00	31	−1	30	00	31	01	32	03	33	04	34
Leap year	−1	30	$m =\left\lfloor{30.6 \times (month + 1)} - 3 \right\rfloor \bmod 60 - i$									

- Stem-branch for February 22, 720 BC (−719).

y = 5 x (720–719) + [1/4] = 5
c = 8
m = 30 + [0.6 x 15 – 3] – 5 = 31
d = 22
SB = 5 + 8 + 31 + 22 – 60 = 6
S = B = 6, 己巳

- Stem-branch for November 1, 211 BC (−210).

y = 5 x (240–210) + [30/4] = 5 x 6 + 7 = 37
c = 8
m = 0 + [0.6 x 12 – 3] = 4
d = 1
SB = 37 + 8 + 4 + 1 = 50
S = 0, B = 2, 癸丑

- Stem-branch for February 18, 1912.

y = 5 x (1912–1920) + [-8/4] + 60 = 18
c = 4 – 19 + 10 = -5
m = 30 + [0.6 x 15 – 3] – 6 = 30
d = 18
SB = 18 – 5 + 30 + 18 – 60 = 1
S = B = 1, 甲子

- Stem-branch for October 1, 1949.

y = 5 x (1949–1920) + [29/4] = 5 x 5 + 7 = 32
c = -5
m = 30 + [0.6 x 11 -3] = 33
d = 1
SB = 32 – 5 + 33 + 1 – 60 = 1
S = B = 1, 甲子

Look up table for sexagenary days
Gregorian		17; 24	15; 22		20	18	23	16	21	19	Centuries														
Julian			01					00			Centuries														
Dates	Mar; Jan					Nov; Dec	Sep; Oct	Aug	Feb; Jun; Jul	Jan; Apr; May; Feb	Years of the century														
Dates	01; 11; 21; 31	02; 12; 22	03; 13; 23	04; 14; 24	05; 15; 25	06; 16; 26	07; 17; 27	08; 18; 28	09; 19; 29	10; 20; 30	Years of the century														
天干	甲	乙	丙	丁	戊	己	庚	辛	壬	癸	Years of the century														
Heavenly stems	A	B	C	D	E	F	G	H	I	J	00	02	21	23	40	42	61	63	80	82					
Heavenly stems	B	C	D	E	F	G	H	I	J	A	04	06	25	27	44	46	65	67	84	86					
Heavenly stems	C	D	E	F	G	H	I	J	A	B	08	10	29	31	48	50	69	71	88	90					
Heavenly stems	D	E	F	G	H	I	J	A	B	C	12	14	33	35	52	54	73	75	92	94					
Heavenly stems	E	F	G	H	I	J	A	B	C	D	16	18	37	39	56	58	77	79	96	98					
Heavenly stems	F	G	H	I	J	A	B	C	D	E	01	03	20	22	41	43	60	62	81	83					
Heavenly stems	G	H	I	J	A	B	C	D	E	F	05	07	24	26	45	47	64	66	85	87					
Heavenly stems	H	I	J	A	B	C	D	E	F	G	09	11	28	30	49	51	68	70	89	91					
Heavenly stems	I	J	A	B	C	D	E	F	G	H	13	15	32	34	53	55	72	74	93	95					
Heavenly stems	J	A	B	C	D	E	F	G	H	I	17	19	36	38	57	59	76	78	97	99					
地支	子	丑	寅	卯	辰	巳	午	未	申	酉	戌	亥	干支纪日速查表												
Earthly branches	A	B	C	D	E	F	G	H	I	J	K	L	00	07	16	23	32	39	48	55	64	71	80	87	96
Earthly branches	B	C	D	E	F	G	H	I	J	K	L	A		14		30		46		62		78		94	
Earthly branches	C	D	E	F	G	H	I	J	K	L	A	B	05		21		37		53		69		85		
Earthly branches	D	E	F	G	H	I	J	K	L	A	B	C	03	12	19	28	35	44	51	60	67	76	83	92	99
Earthly branches	E	F	G	H	I	J	K	L	A	B	C	D		10		26		42		58		74		90	
Earthly branches	F	G	H	I	J	K	L	A	B	C	D	E	01		17		33		49		65		81		97
Earthly branches	G	H	I	J	K	L	A	B	C	D	E	F	08	15	24	31	40	47	56	63	72	79	88	95	
Earthly branches	H	I	J	K	L	A	B	C	D	E	F	G	06		22		38		54		70		86		
Earthly branches	I	J	K	L	A	B	C	D	E	F	G	H		13		29		45		61		77		93	
Earthly branches	J	K	L	A	B	C	D	E	F	G	H	I	04	11	20	27	36	43	52	59	68	75	84	91	
Earthly branches	K	L	A	B	C	D	E	F	G	H	I	J	02		18		34		50		66		82		98
Earthly branches	L	A	B	C	D	E	F	G	H	I	J	K		09		25		41		57		73		89	
Dates	01; 13; 25	02; 14; 26	03; 15; 27	04; 16; 28	05; 17; 29	06; 18; 30	07; 19; 31	08; 20	09; 21	10; 22	11; 23	12; 24	Years of the century												
Dates	Mar; Jan	Dec	Oct	Aug	Feb; Jun	Apr; Feb		Nov	Sep		Jul	Jan; May	Years of the century												
Gregorian		15; 18	21	24		17	20; 23			16; 19	22		Centuries												
Julian		02			01			00			03		Centuries												

== Sexagenary hours ==
Table for sexagenary hours (5-day cycle)
Stem of the day	Zǐ hour 子时 23:00–1:00	Chǒu hour 丑时 1:00–3:00	Yín hour 寅时 3:00–5:00	Mǎo hour 卯时 5:00–7:00	Chén hour 辰时 7:00–9:00	Sì hour 巳时 9:00–11:00	Wǔ hour 午时 11:00–13:00	Wèi hour 未时 13:00–15:00	Shēn hour 申时 15:00–17:00	Yǒu hour 酉时 17:00–19:00	Xū hour 戌时 19:00–21:00	Hài hour 亥时 21:00–23:00
Jia or Ji day (甲/己)	1 甲子	2乙丑	3 丙寅	4 丁卯	5 戊辰	6 己巳	7 庚午	8 辛未	9 壬申	10 癸酉	11 甲戌	12 乙亥
Yi or Geng day (乙/庚)	13 丙子	14 丁丑	15 戊寅	16 己卯	17 庚辰	18 辛巳	19 壬午	20 癸未	21 甲申	22 乙酉	23 丙戌	24 丁亥
Bing or Xin day (丙/辛)	25 戊子	26 己丑	27 庚寅	28 辛卯	29 壬辰	30 癸巳	31 甲午	32 乙未	33 丙申	34 丁酉	35 戊戌	36 己亥
Ding or Ren day (丁/壬)	37 庚子	38 辛丑	39 壬寅	40 癸卯	41 甲辰	42 乙巳	43 丙午	44 丁未	45 戊申	46 己酉	47 庚戌	48 辛亥
Wu or Gui day (戊/癸)	49 壬子	50 癸丑	51 甲寅	52 乙卯	53 丙辰	54 丁巳	55 戊午	56 己未	57 庚申	58 辛酉	59 壬戌	60 癸亥

== See also ==
- Doumu (斗母元君)
- Tai Sui (太歲)
- Chinese calendar
- Chinese era name
- Lunisolar calendar
- Japanese invasions of Korea (1592–1598), known in Korean as the "Imjin War", after the imjin (Yang Water Dragon) year 1592.
- Koshien Stadium (Japan), named after the kōshi (Yang Wood Rat) year 1924. One of the last examples of general usage of the cycle in Japan.
- Tet Offensive – Vietnamese name of the event, "Tết Mậu Thân Event", named after the Mậu Thân (Yang Earth Monkey) year 1968.
- Xinhai Revolution (China), named after the xinhai (Yin Metal Pig) year 1911
- Samvatsara
- Wude Zhongshi Shuo
- Ziwu Liuzhu (Chinese medicine)
- Four Pillars of Destiny
- Chinese astronomy
