= Wood Rat =

First element of the sexagenary cycle

Chinese name
- Chinese: 甲子
Transcriptions
Standard Mandarin
- Hanyu Pinyin: jiǎzǐ

Vietnamese name
- Vietnamese alphabet: Giáp Tý
- Chữ Hán: 甲子

South Korean name
- Hangul: 갑자
- Hanja: 甲子
Transcriptions
- Revised Romanization: gapja

Japanese name
- Kanji: 甲子
- Kana: きのえね かっし こうし
Transcriptions
- Romanization: kinoene kasshi kōshi

Sexagenary cycle
01; Wood Rat	02; Wood Ox	03; Fire Tiger	04; Fire Rabbit	05; Earth Dragon	06; Earth Snake
07; Metal Horse	08; Metal Goat	09; Water Monkey	10; Water Rooster	11; Wood Dog	12; Wood Pig
13; Fire Rat	14; Fire Ox	15; Earth Tiger	16; Earth Rabbit	17; Metal Dragon	18; Metal Snake
19; Water Horse	20; Water Goat	21; Wood Monkey	22; Wood Rooster	23; Fire Dog	24; Fire Pig
25; Earth Rat	26; Earth Ox	27; Metal Tiger	28; Metal Rabbit	29; Water Dragon	30; Water Snake
31; Wood Horse	32; Wood Goat	33; Fire Monkey	34; Fire Rooster	35; Earth Dog	36; Earth Pig
37; Metal Rat	38; Metal Ox	39; Water Tiger	40; Water Rabbit	41; Wood Dragon	42; Wood Snake
43; Fire Horse	44; Fire Goat	45; Earth Monkey	46; Earth Rooster	47; Metal Dog	48; Metal Pig
49; Water Rat	50; Water Ox	51; Wood Tiger	52; Wood Rabbit	53; Fire Dragon	54; Fire Snake
55; Earth Horse	56; Earth Goat	57; Metal Monkey	58; Metal Rooster	59; Water Dog	60; Water Pig

Heavenly Stems ・ Earthly Branches

Wood Rat (Chinese: 甲子; pinyin: jiǎzǐ) is the first combination of the sexagenary cycle of the Chinese zodiac. It is preceded by Water Pig and followed by Wood Ox. In the traditional correspondence of the Heavenly Stems with the Five Phases, jiǎ (甲) represents yang and Wood, while the Earthly Branch zǐ (子) corresponds to the Rat zodiac.

== Overview ==
It was four years after the year of the Metal Rooster, the year of the Revolution of the Dynasty changeover, and was considered the year of the revolutionary decree, or the year of many upheavals, when the Tian will is renewed and heavenly commands are given to those who possess virtue (Kōji kaihatsu'). In order to prevent this, the new year has often been held in this year since the Heian period in Japan. Since the Koshi Reform of 1024, the only year prior to the Meiji era (when the reign of the first emperor was abolished with the decree of Issei Ichigen) in which there was no Koshi Reform was in Eiroku 7 (1564).

Emperor Emperor Kanmu was also the son of Tenchi, who ascended to the throne after the Tenmu lineage was severed by the murder of his half-brother Otomo, a prince of the Tenchi line. Emperor Kōnin, and it is said that he moved the capital to Nagaoka-kyo in 784, the year of the Revolution, because he was strongly aware of the change of royal line.

The Yellow Turban Rebellion occurred in 184, the last days of the Later Han Dynasty in China and caused a fatal blow to the Han Dynasty. One slogan it used was "蒼天已死 黄天當立 歳在甲子 天下大吉" meaning "The azure sky is dead, the yellow sky rises. The year is the Wood Rat, and there is great auspiciousness under heaven." ("Book of the Later Han|The Later Han Dynasty"). Volume 71: Huangfu Song, Zhu Shiyi, Biography 61 Huang Fu Bulk biography)".

A hot spring discovered in Mutsu (now Fukushima Prefecture) in Nanboku-chō period in 1384 was named Koshi Onsen (甲子温泉) in honor of the year Koshi.

Ito Daizo (大藏) changed his name to Ito Koshi-taro (Kashitaro/Kinetaro) in honor of the first year of Genji (1864), the year of the Koshi.

The baseball stadium built in Taisho 13 (1924) in Hyōgo Prefecture Nishinomiya City was named "Koshien Grand Sports Ground" (now Hanshin Koshien Stadium) after the Chinese zodiac of that year. It is also the name of a place in the city. This year also marks the origin of the name of the Tokyo Kosha Company.

== Wood Rat years ==
A year of the Wood Rat occurs every 60 years, in a year that ends in 4, according to the following table:

1st millennium	2nd millennium	3rd millennium	4th millennium
4; 64; 124; 184; 244; 304; 364; 424; 484; 544; 604; 664; 724; 784; 844; 904; 964	1024; 1084; 1144; 1204; 1264; 1324; 1384; 1444; 1504; 1564; 1624; 1684; 1744; 1804; 1864; 1924; 1984	2044; 2104; 2164; 2224; 2284; 2344; 2404; 2464; 2524; 2584; 2644; 2704; 2764; 2824; 2884; 2944	3004; 3064; 3124; 3184; 3244; 3304; 3364; 3424; 3484; 3544; 3604; 3664; 3724; 3784; 3844; 3904; 3964

== Wood Rat months ==
When months are numbered using the sexagenary cycle, the eleventh month of a year whose heavenly stem is 戊 (wù) or 癸 (guǐ) is a Wood Rat month.

== Wood Rat days ==
A Wood Rat day occurs every 60 days according to the following table:

2023	2024	2025	2026	2027	2028	2029
6 January; 7 March; 6 May; 5 July; 3 September; 2 November	1 January; 1 March; 30 April; 29 June; 28 August; 27 October; 26 December	24 February; 25 April; 24 June; 23 August; 22 October; 21 December	19 February; 20 April; 19 June; 18 August; 17 October; 16 December	14 February; 15 April; 14 June; 13 August; 12 October; 11 December	9 February; 9 April; 8 June; 7 August; 6 October; 5 December	3 February; 4 April; 3 June; 2 August; 1 October; 30 November

== See also ==
- Hwangap
