= 230s =

Decade

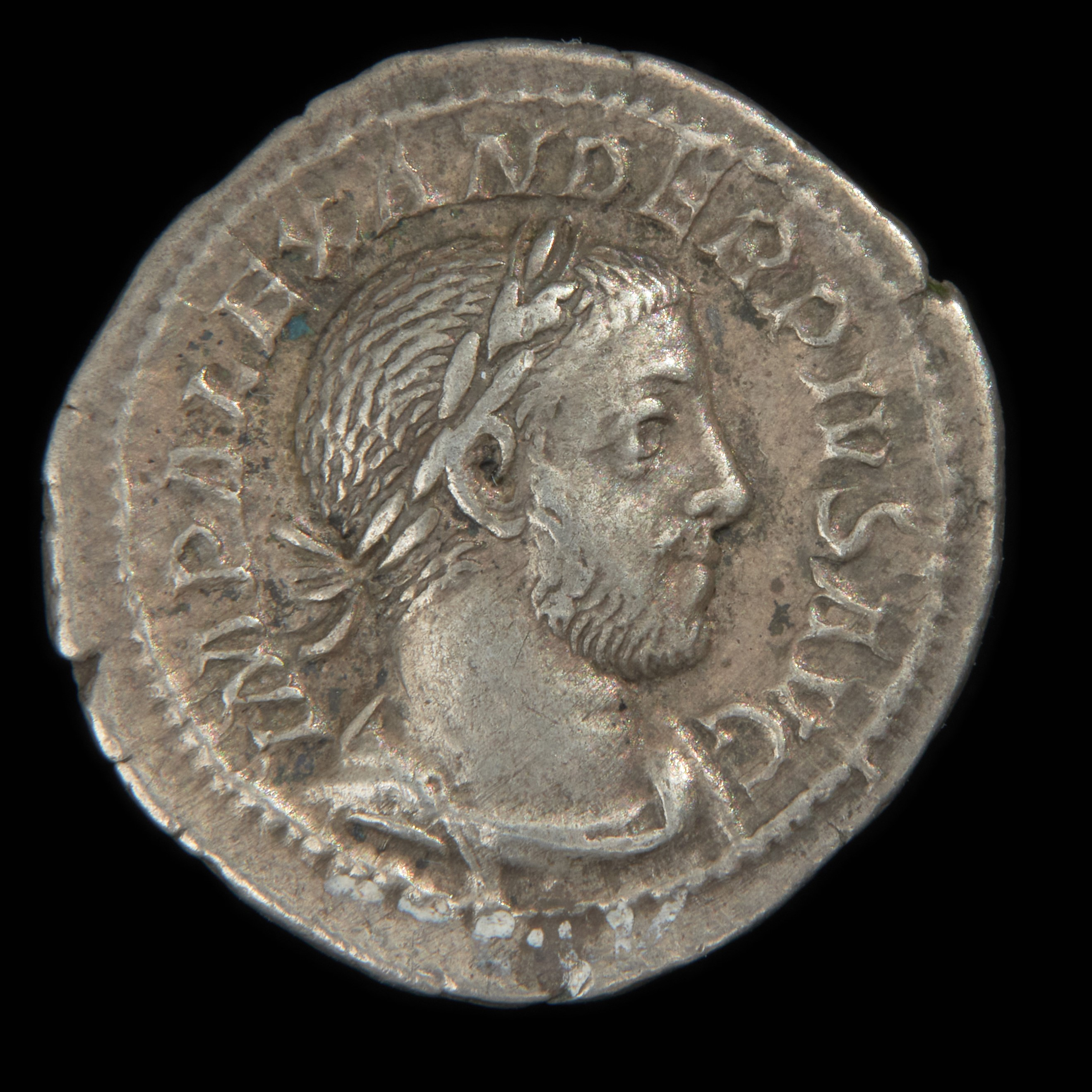
The murder of Severus Alexander marks the end of the Severan dynasty and the start of the Crisis of the Third Century.

The 230s decade ran from January 1, 230 to December 31, 239.

== Events ==
=== By place ===
==== Roman Empire ====
- Emperor Alexander Severus decides that Thessaly should be a separate province from Macedonia. He increases taxes, in order to maintain the war against the Sassanids, and strengthen the defenses of the Roman Empire.

==== Persian Empire ====
- King Ardashir I of the Persian Empire invades the Roman province of Mesopotamia, and unsuccessfully besieges the fortress town of Nisibis (Turkey). His army threatens the border outposts of Syria and Cappadocia.
- Alexander Severus assembles the Roman army, and establishes his headquarters at Antioch. He attempts a diplomatic solution, but the Persians decline and choose war.

==== Korea ====
- Jobun becomes king of the Korean kingdom of Silla.

=== By topic ===
==== Religion ====
- July 21 – Pope Pontian succeeds Pope Urban I, as the 18th pope of Rome.
- Patriarch Castinus succeeds Ciriacus I as patriarch Constantinople.
- Seventy bishops hold the council of the Christian Church of Africa.

=== By place ===
==== Roman Empire ====
- Emperor Alexander Severus accompanies his mother Julia Mamaea to Syria, and campaigns against the Persians. Military command rests in the hands of his generals, but his presence gives additional weight to the empire's policy.

==== China ====
- March – August – Battle of Mount Qi: The Chinese state of Shu Han gains a tactical victory, and the state of Cao Wei a strategic victory.

=== By topic ===
==== Religion ====
- Origen, disciple of Ammonius Saccas, founder of Neoplatonism, is exiled in Caesarea.

=== By place ===
==== Roman Empire ====
- Roman–Persian Wars: Emperor Alexander Severus launches a three-pronged counterattack against the Persian forces of King Ardashir I, who have invaded Mesopotamia. However, the Roman army advancing through Armenia is halted. Alexander gives the order to march to the capital at Ctesiphon, but the Romans are defeated, and withdraw to Syria. The result is an acceptance of the status quo, and after heavy losses on both sides, a truce is signed.

=== By topic ===
==== Religion ====
- Relics of St. Thomas are brought to Edessa from India.
- Origen founds a school of Christian theology in Palestine.
- Pope Heraclas of Alexandria is the first Bishop of Alexandria to use the appellation of "Pope".

=== By place ===
==== Roman Empire ====
- Emperor Alexander Severus celebrates a triumph in Rome to observe his "victory" the previous year over the Persians (in reality, Severus Alexander advanced towards Ctesiphon in 233, but as corroborated by Herodian, his armies suffered a humiliating defeat against Ardashir I). He is soon summoned to the Rhine frontier, where the Alamanni invade what is now modern-day Swabia. German tribes destroy Roman forts, and plunder the countryside at the Limes Germanicus.

=== By place ===
==== Roman Empire ====
- Emperor Alexander Severus and his mother Julia Mamaea move to Moguntiacum (modern Mainz), the capital of Germania Superior. His generals have planned a military offensive and built a bridge across the Rhine. Alexander prefers to negotiate for peace by buying off the Alemanni. This policy outrages the Roman legions and he loses the trust of the troops.

==== China ====
- Battle of Wuzhang Plains between the Chinese states of Shu Han and Cao Wei: The army of Shu Han retreats, following an inconclusive result.

==== Korea ====
- Saban becomes king of the Korean kingdom of Baekje. He is succeeded by Goi of Baekje later in the same year.

=== By place ===
==== Roman Empire ====
- March 22 – Emperor Severus Alexander and his mother Iulia Mamaea are murdered by their own soldiers. The soldiers proclaim Maximinus Thrax as emperor. The Severan dynasty ends, marking the beginning of the Crisis of the Third Century.

=== By topic ===
==== Religion ====
- September 28 – Pope Pontian resigns, the first to abdicate, because he and Hippolytus, church leader of Rome, are exiled to the mines of Sardinia. Emperor Maximinus persecutes the Christians.
- November 21 – Anterus succeeds Pontian as the nineteenth pope of Rome.

=== By place ===
==== Roman Empire ====
- Emperor Maximinus Thrax and Marcus Pupienus Africanus Maximus become Roman consuls.
- The Roman Senate appoints a twenty-man committee to co-ordinate operations against Maximinus.
- Maximinus campaigns against Dacians and Sarmatians from his supply depot at Sirmium.

=== By topic ===
==== Religion ====
- January 10 – Pope Fabian succeeds Pope Anterus as the twentieth pope.
- Fabian separates Rome into seven deaconships.
- Fabian sends seven missionaries to Gaul to evangelize in the large cities.

=== By place ===
==== Roman Empire ====
- Emperor Maximinus Thrax campaigns on the rivers Danube and Rhine in Germania, defeating the Alemanni, and never visits Rome. He is accepted by the Roman Senate, but taxes the rich aristocracy heavily, and engenders such hostility among them, that they plot against him. He had a road rebuilt in what is now the Golan Heights, between 236 and 237.

==== Persia ====
- King Ardashir I of Persia renews his attacks on the Roman province of Mesopotamia.

=== By topic ===
==== Religion ====
- Patriarch Eugenius I succeeds Patriarch Castinus as Patriarch of Constantinople.
- Saint Babylas becomes Patriarch of Antioch.

=== By place ===
==== Roman Empire ====
- Emperor Maximinus Thrax campaigns against the Carpians on the Danube in Moesia (Balkans). In spite of the payment of a tribute, the Romans fail to persuade the Goths and the Germanic tribes.
- c. March – Roman subjects in Africa revolt against Maximinus. The elderly Gordian yields to public demand that he succeed Maximinus and rules jointly with his 46-year-old son Gordian II.
- c. April – Battle of Carthage: Numidian forces loyal to Maximinus invade Africa with support of Legio III Augusta. Gordian II is killed and after a siege, Gordian I commits suicide by hanging himself with his belt.
- c. May – The Senate outlaws Maximinus for his bloodthirsty proscriptions in Ancient Rome and nominates two of its members, Pupienus and Balbinus, to the throne.
- Maximinus advances to the town Aquileia in northern Italy; his army suffers from famine and disease, while the city is besieged. Soldiers of Legio II Parthica kill him in his tent, along with his son Maximinus (who is appointed co-emperor). Their corpses are decapitated and their heads carried to Rome.
- c. August – The Praetorian Guard storms the palace and captures Pupienus and Balbinus. They are dragged naked through the streets of Rome and executed. On the same day Gordian III, age 13, is proclaimed the new emperor. Timesitheus becomes his tutor and advisor.
- Future Emperor Valerian becomes princeps senatus.
- The Colosseum is restored after being damaged.
- The Goths, coming from Ukraine, cross the Danube and devastate the Roman Empire up to the border with Anatolia.
- In North Africa, Legio III Augusta is dissolved. Until its reconstitution in 253, Africa is defended by auxiliary forces only.

==== China ====
- Sima Yi, a Chinese general of the Cao Wei state, destroys the outlying northeastern warlord Gongsun Yuan in the Liaodong campaign.

=== By topic ===
==== Commerce ====
- The silver content of the Roman denarius falls to 28 percent under Emperor Gordian III, down from 35 percent under Alexander Severus.

=== By place ===
==== Asia ====
- Cao Fang succeeds his adoptive father Cao Rui as emperor of the Cao Wei state, in the Three Kingdoms period of China.
- A Chinese expeditionary force from the Eastern Wu state discovers the island of Taiwan.
- Queen of Yamataikoku (Japan), Himiko was given Golden signature stamp by Cao Wei (China)

=== By topic ===
==== Religion ====
- Origen publishes the Old Testament in five languages (approximate date).

== Births ==
230

- Gaius Vibius Volusianus, Roman emperor (d. 253)
- Marcus Aurelius Carus, Roman emperor (d. 283)

231

- Cao Xun, Chinese prince of the Cao Wei state (d. 244)

232

- August 19 – Marcus Aurelius Probus, Roman emperor (d. 282)
- Cao Fang, Chinese emperor of the Cao Wei state (d. 274)
- Sun Chen (or Zitong), Chinese general and regent (d. 259)
- Zhang Hua, Chinese official, scholar and poet (d. 300)

233

- Chen Shou, Chinese historian and writer of the Records of the Three Kingdoms (d. 297)

234

- Porphyry, Phoenician Neoplatonic philosopher (d. c. 305)
- Wang Rong, Chinese general and politician (d. 305)

235

- Sun Xiu, Chinese emperor of the Eastern Wu state (d. 264)

236

- Wu of Jin (Sima Yan), Chinese emperor (d. 290)
- Zhang Ti, Chinese official and chancellor (d. 280)
- Zhou Chu, Chinese general and politician (d. 297)

237

- Alexander of Constantinople, patriarch of Constantinople
- Guo Huai (or Yuhuang), Chinese noblewoman (d. 296)
- Philip II (the Younger), Roman emperor (d. 249)

238

- Wen Yang (or Ciqian), Chinese general (d. 291)
- Yang Yan (or Wuyuan), Chinese empress (d. 274)

== Deaths ==
230

- May 23 – Urban I, bishop of Rome (b. 175)
- July 9 – Bian, Chinese empress dowager (b. 159)
- Go Uru, Korean prime minister
- Liang Xi, Chinese official and politician
- Marius Maximus, Roman consul and biographer
- Naehae of Silla, Korean ruler
- Wu Zhi, Chinese official and general (b. 177)
- Zhang Wen, Chinese official and politician (b. 193)
- Zhang Yi, Chinese official and politician (b. 167)
- Zhong Yao, Chinese official and calligrapher (b. 151)

231

- Cao Zhen, Chinese general of the Cao Wei state
- Li Hui (or De'ang), Chinese official and politician
- Zhang He, Chinese general of the Cao Wei state

232

- January 30 – Hua Xin, Chinese official and politician (b. 157)
- October 22 – Demetrius I, patriarch of Alexandria (b. 127)
- December 27 – Cao Zhi, Chinese prince and poet (b. 192)
- Cao Hong, Chinese general of the Cao Wei state
- Sun Lü, Chinese general of the Cao Wei state
- Tiberius Julius Sauromates III, Roman client king

233

- June 13 – Cao Rui, Chinese imperial prince of the Cao Wei state
- Liu Ji, Chinese official and politician of the Eastern Wu state (b. 185)
- Yu Fan, Chinese official and politician of the Eastern Wu state (b. 164)

234

- April 21 – Xian of Han, Chinese emperor of the Han Dynasty (b. 181)
- Li Miao (or Hannan), Chinese official and politician
- Li Yan (or Li Ping), Chinese general and politician
- Liu Yan (or Weishuo), Chinese general and politician
- Liu Ye (or Ziyang), Chinese court adviser and politician
- Pan Zhang (or Wengui), Chinese general and politician
- Sun Huan (or Jiming), Chinese nobleman and general
- Wei Yan (or Wenchang), Chinese general and politician
- Xiahou Hui (or Yuanrong), Chinese noblewoman (b. 211)
- Zhuge Liang, Chinese statesman and strategist (b. 181)

235

- March 22 – Severus Alexander, Roman emperor (b. 208)
- Cao Gun, Chinese imperial prince
- Cassius Dio, Roman historian
- Chen Zhen (or Xiaoqi), Chinese official and politician
- Gaius Petronius Magnus, Roman consul and usurper
- Guo Nüwang, Chinese empress
- Hippolytus, Christian theologian and writer (b. 170)
- Julia Avita Mamaea, mother of Severus Alexander (b. 180)
- Tiberius Julius Cotys III (or Kotys), Roman client king
- Tiberius Julius Rhescuporis IV, Roman client king
- Titius Quartinus, Roman governor and usurper
- Xin Pi (or Zuozhi), Chinese official and politician
- Yang Yi (or Weigong), Chinese official and adviser

236

- January 3 – Anterus, bishop of Rome
- July 4 – Dong Zhao, Chinese official and politician (b. 156)
- Zhang Zhao, Chinese general and politician (b. 156)

237

- February 7 – Chen Qun, Chinese official and politician
- September 22 – Mingdao (or Mao), Chinese empress
- Wu Yi (or Ziyuan), Chinese general of the Shu Han state
- Zhang (or Jing'ai), Chinese empress of the Shu Han state

238

- April 10 – Han Ji (or Gongzhi), Chinese politician
- April 12
  - Gordian I, Roman emperor (b. 159)
  - Gordian II, Roman emperor (b. 192)
- July 29
  - Pupienus, Roman emperor (b. 165)
  - Balbinus, Roman emperor (b. 178)
- Bu Lianshi, Chinese noblewoman and concubine
- Gongsun Yuan (or Wenyi), Chinese warlord
- Maximinus Thrax, Roman emperor (b. 173)
- Maximinus the Younger, Roman emperor
- Zhu Huan (or Xiumu), Chinese general (b. 177)

239

- January 22 – Cao Rui (or Yuanzhong), Chinese emperor (b. 206)
- Lu Mao (or Zizhang), Chinese official and politician
- Pan Jun (or Chengming), Chinese official and general
