= Han campaigns against Minyue =

Han military campaigns against Minyue

- Part of the southward expansion of the Han dynasty
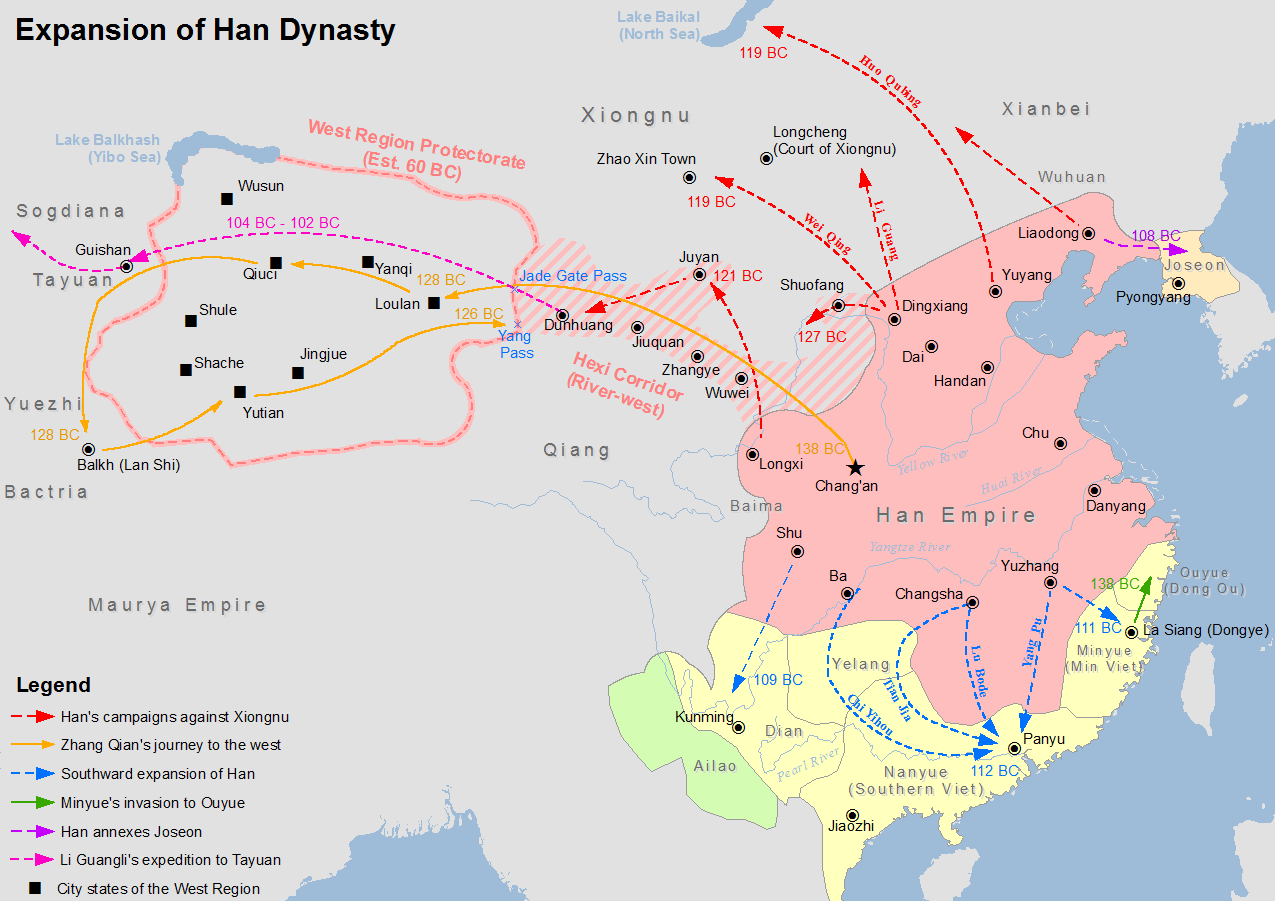
- Map showing the expansion of Han dynasty in the 2nd century BC
Date	138 BC, 135 BC, and 111 BC
Location	Minyue (modern Fujian)
Result	138 BC: Minyue surrender and withdrawal from Eastern Ou; 135 BC: Minyue defeated and divided by the Han dynasty among the Minyue king and the Dongyue king; 111 BC: Cultural assimilation and displacement of the Dongyue by the Han Empire; Eastern Ou annexed by the Han Empire; Han settlement and migration southward; Contact and establishment of commercial trade with various foreign kingdoms across Southeast Asia

Belligerents
Han dynasty Dong'ou; Nanyue	Minyue

Commanders and leaders
138 BC; Zhuang Zhu; 135 BC; Wang Hui; Han Anguo; 111 BC Han Yue; Yang Pu; Wang Wenshu; Two marquises of Yue	135 BC; Zou Ying; 111 BC Zou Yushan

The Han campaigns against Minyue were a series of three Han military campaigns dispatched against the Minyue state. The first campaign was in response to Minyue's invasion of Eastern Ou in 138 BC. In 135 BC, a second campaign was sent to intervene in a war between Minyue and Nanyue. After the campaign, the Han dynasty divided Minyue among the Minyue king Zou Chou (騶丑) and the Dongyue king Zou Yushan (騶餘善). In 111 BC, the rebellion instigated by Zou Yushan in the hope of self-governance was suppressed, prompting the Han dynasty's complete annexation of Dongyue into its dominion and the conquest of the residual territories that constituted the former Minyue, effectively consolidating the permanent integration of both domains into the Han empire indefinitely.

== Background ==
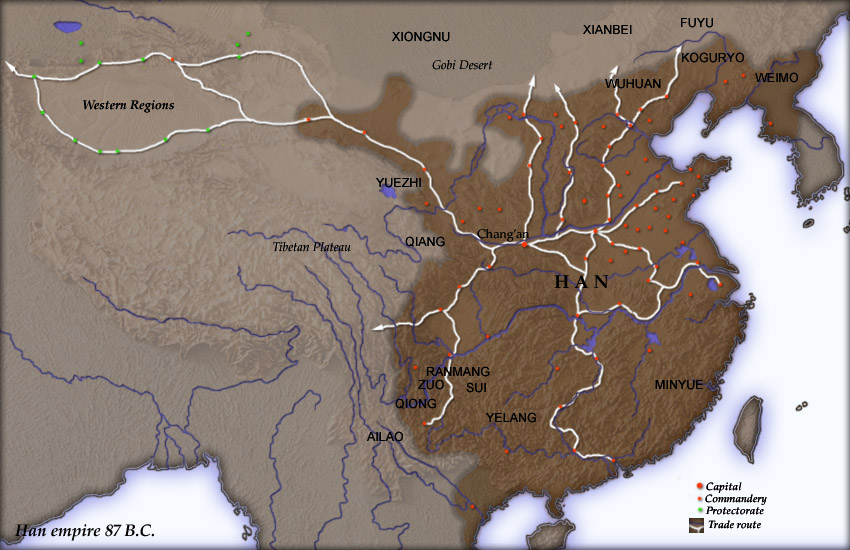
The Han dynasty in 87 BC.

The Qin dynasty's initiative military incursions into what is now Southern China engendered an era of periodic expansion that continued under the Han. After the fall of the Qin, Minyue was established in 202 BC, and Eastern Ou in 192 BC, with the support of the Han. They were rewarded with greater autonomy in return for their contributions to the revolt against the Qin. The local rulers of the Minyue region had also sided with Liu Bang's Han instead of Xiang Yu's Chu during the Chu–Han Contention, a civil war that ensued during the collapse of the Qin.

Minyue was created by carving out the former Qin province of Minzhong, with Dongye as the capital, into a new kingdom ruled by Zou Wuzhu. A decade later, Zou Yao was granted control over Donghai, popularly referred to as Eastern Ou after the name of the kingdom's capital. The title was bestowed with a declaration by the Han emperor that "Zou Yan, the chief of Min, achieved great merit and his people supported the Han cause". The Han historian Sima Qian claims both rulers were descendants of Goujian, the 5th century BC ruler of Yue. The family had lost their status as rulers during the Qin's wars of unification, when they were demoted to local chieftains.

== Han–Minyue wars ==
=== Intent of Minyue ===
While Minyue invasion of its neighbors appears to be a "spontaneous whim of a foolhardy and greedy king Zou Ying" in the Han dynasty history books, given the geopolitical circumstances, Brindley (2015) wrote that "We should therefore consider Minyue aggression in the 130s in terms of a series of pre-emptive, southerly strikes intended to stave off Han encroachment and potential takeover."

=== Initial military intervention ===
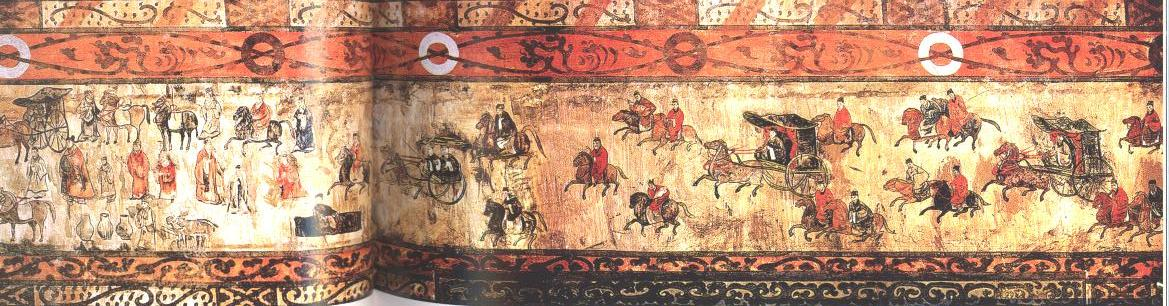
Mural showing cavalry and chariots, from the Dahuting Tomb (Chinese: 打虎亭汉墓, Pinyin: Dahuting Han mu) of the late Eastern Han dynasty (25-220 AD), located in Zhengzhou, Henan province, China

In 138 BC, Minyue invaded the Eastern Ou, prompting Eastern Ou to request the intervention of Han forces. The Han court was divided over offering military support. The campaign was opposed by the Han commander-in-chief Tian Fen, who argued that warfare between the Yue tribes occurred frequently and the affairs of Yue were not the responsibility of the Han government. The concept of Chinese centrality among nations persuaded the court to dispatch an army. In accordance with Chinese political philosophy, the ruler or Son of Heaven held a mandate that obligated the emperor to help smaller countries in need. Otherwise, as the Han official Zhuang Zhu phrased it, "how could we treat the myriad kingdoms as our children?"

A Han naval force led by Zhuang Zhu departed from Shaoxing in northern Zhejiang towards Minyue. The Minyue surrendered before the arrival of the Han troops, and withdrew from Eastern Ou. There were plans to move the residents of Eastern Ou to the area between the Huai River and Yangtze River, following a request by the king of Eastern Ou.

=== Second intervention ===
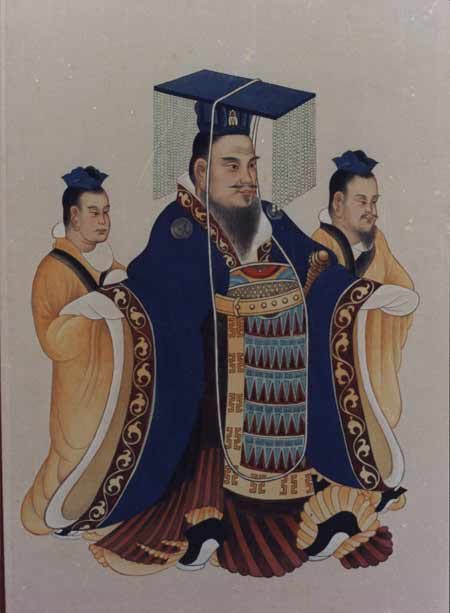
Emperor Wu of the Han went to war with the Minyue.

In 135 BC, war broke out when Minyue invaded Nanyue. Zhao Mo, the king of Nanyue, asked for and received the military assistance of the Han. In 180 BC, Zhao had offered to submit as a vassal and the Han agreed, a decision that was partly based on Zhao's ancestral roots in northern China. An army led by the generals Wang Hui and Han Anguo was ordered to invade Minyue. The campaign was cut short by palace infighting in the Minyue court. Panicked at news of an invasion, the younger brother of the Minyue king Zou Ying, Zou Yushan, conspired with the royal court to depose Ying. Yushan killed his brother with a spear, decapitated the corpse, and sent the head to Wang. The Han forces withdrew soon after.

Zhao Mo was grateful for the speed of the intervention against Minyue. The Han official Zhuang Zhu was dispatched to meet with the Nanyue emperor, who expressed his gratitude. Zhao sent his son, the prince Zhao Yingqi, to the Han capital at Chang'an, where he was to work for the Emperor. In the aftermath of the campaign, Zou Chou was selected to fill the role of Han proxy ruler because he was the only member of the Minyue royal family who refused to take part in the war against Nanyue. However, his efforts to exert control over the people of Minyue were not successful. The subjects of the kingdom pledged their loyalty to Zou Yushan instead. Yushan declared himself king of Minyue without the consent of the Emperor Wu, the Han ruler. The emperor was informed of Yushan's actions, and recognized him as king of Dongyue instead of ordering a second invasion. Emperor Wu considered it a reward to Yushan for killing Zou Ying and ending the war, for the assassination had prevented the Han from wasting any more resources on the conflict. As a result, there were two kings coexisting in the country. Dongyue had an uneasy relationship with the Han. In 112 BC, Han officials were killed in a military engagement with Dongyue.

=== Third campaign and conquest ===
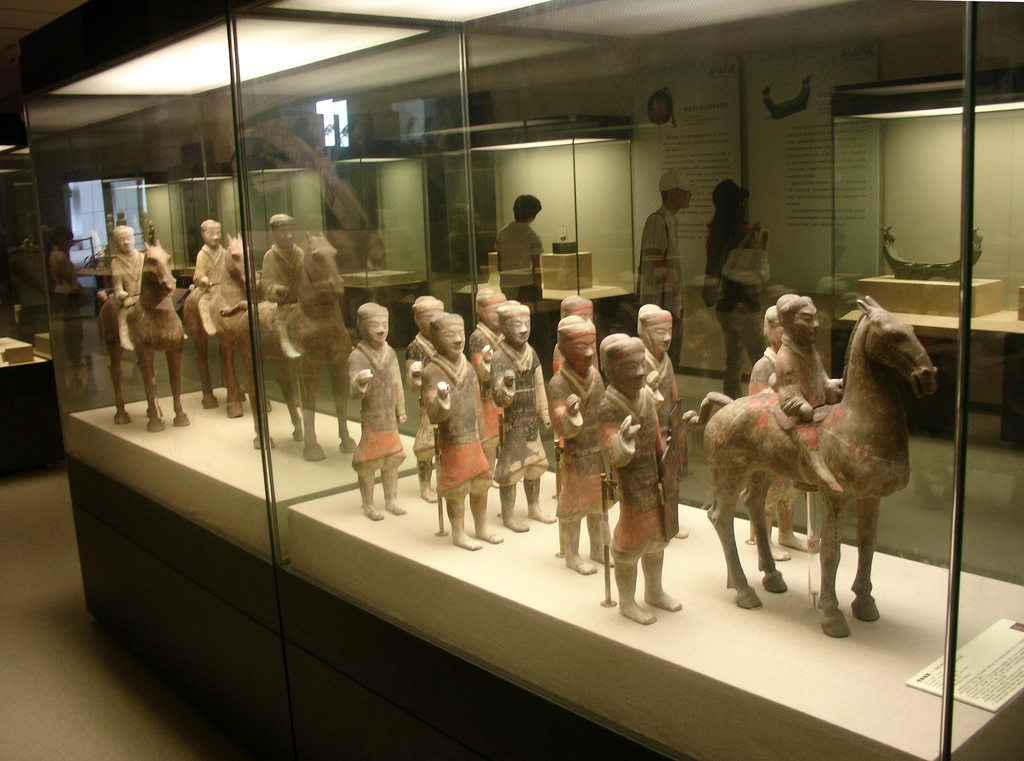
Western Han miniature pottery infantry (foreground) and cavalry (background); in 1990, when the tomb complex of Emperor Jing of Han (r. 157 – 141 BC) and his wife Empress Wang Zhi (d. 126 BC) was excavated north of Yangling, over 40,000 miniature pottery figures were unearthed. All of them were one-third life size, smaller than the 8,000-some fully life size soldiers of the Terracotta Army buried alongside the First Emperor of Qin. Smaller miniature figurines, on average 60 centimeters (24 in) in height, have also been found in various royal Han tombs where they were placed to guard the deceased tomb occupants in their afterlife.

As Han troops returned from the Han–Nanyue War in 111 BC, the Han government debated annexing Dongyue. Dongyue, under King Zou Yushan, had agreed to assist the Han campaign against Nanyue, but the Dongyue army never reached Nanyue. Yushan blamed the delay on the weather. The proposal to annex Dongyue was suggested by General Yang Pu, but was dismissed by Emperor Wu. The naval force arrived home without having attacked Dongyue. Zou caught wind of Yang's request, and responded by revolting against the Han. He then proclaimed himself Emperor of Dongyue (東越武帝) and sent troops to guard the important roads and to attack Baisha, Wulin and Meiling in the Han Empire, killing three local officials. Han forces were led by General Han Yue, General Yang Pu, commander Wang Wenshu, and two marquises of Yue ancestry. The army crushed the rebellion and captured Dongyue in the last months of 111 BC, placing the former Minyue territory under Han rule.

Historical records report that Minyue and Dongyue were emptied of people, and that its residents were deported to the territories between the Huai River and the Yangtze River. The alleged population transfer was a resumption of a policy that had been planned since 138 BC. The Han government considered the mountainous region difficult to control and was wary of trusting its residents. Modern historians doubt the event happened. The deportation of an entire kingdom is implausible, and nothing has been found to verify a migration of Han settlers to the Minyue region around the year 1, something that would have occurred had the area been abandoned while under Han control. There was only one town of Han settlers, Dongyue, in Minyue. Dongyue was built where the Min River meets the sea, around the time of Emperor Wu's reign. It is more likely that the assimilation of Minyue into Han Chinese culture through Han conquest happened later in the dynasty.

== Historical significance ==
From one settlement in year 1, the Han dynasty's involvement in the Minyue region gradually grew into several counties over the next three centuries, with many Chinese counties sprouting and having been established in the area by the 4th century AD. The Minyue had been culturally assimilated by the Han Chinese by the time of the Han dynasty's collapse and Chinese civilization itself was undergoing a transition to the Three Kingdoms period of Cao Wei, Shu Han, and Eastern Wu. Political upheaval in the north, such as Wang Mang's usurpation, had sent waves of Northern Han migrants to resettle in the south. The Han dynasty's military expansion widened its commercial trade ties and geopolitical relations with various foreign countries when it was brought into the orbit of the various Southeast Asian polities on top of the acquisition of vast amounts of new territories that came under the control of the dynasty's hegemonic command. This expansion of the Han dynasty's geopolitical sphere of influence invariably extended to the nearby Southeast Asian kingdoms, where foreign contact led to the diffusive percolation of Han Chinese culture, trade, and political diplomacy with the empire having broadened its overseas trade relations with the various Southeast Asian polities around the Indian Ocean. The dynasty's conquest of Minyue and Nanyue spoke of its geopolitical influence, predominance, and prominence as the empire itself was exemplified by its military might, advanced technology, economic prosperity, and rich culture coupled with its immense topographical size and vast territorial reach that geographically loomed along the Southeast Asian polities. Economic ties maintained by the Han and their dynastic successors affected the trajectory of maritime trade with Southeast Asia, where goods have been excavated made in styles resembling the distinctive sensibilities of the ancient Han Chinese. Maritime trade and the Silk Road also linked Han China with Ancient Rome, India, and the Near East.

== Bibliography ==
- Brindley, Erica (2015). Ancient China and the Yue Perceptions and Identities on the Southern Frontier, c.400 BCE–50 CE. Cambridge University Press.
- Gernet, Jacques (1996). A History of Chinese Civilization. Cambridge University Press. ISBN 978-0-521-49781-7.
- Holcombe, Charles (2001). The Genesis of East Asia: 221 B.C. – A.D. 907. University of Hawaii Press. ISBN 978-0-8248-2465-5.
- Yu, Yingshi (1986). Twitchett, Denis; Loewe, Michael (eds.). Cambridge History of China: Volume I: the Ch'in and Han Empires, 221 B.C. – A.D. 220. University of Cambridge Press. ISBN 978-0-521-24327-8.
- Lorge, Peter (2012). Graff, David Andrew; Higham, Robin D. S. (eds.). A Military History of China. University Press of Kentucky. ISBN 978-0-8131-3584-7.
- Sima, Qian; Watson, Burton (1993). Records of the Grand Historian: Han Dynasty II. Translation and commentary by Watson. Columbia University Press. ISBN 978-0-231-08166-5.
- Whiting, Marvin C. (2002), Imperial Chinese Military History, Writers Club Press.
