= 230 =

230 in various calendars
- Gregorian calendar: 230; CCXXX
- Ab urbe condita: 983
- Assyrian calendar: 4980
- Balinese saka calendar: 151–152
- Bengali calendar: −364 – −363
- Berber calendar: 1180
- Buddhist calendar: 774
- Burmese calendar: −408
- Byzantine calendar: 5738–5739
- Chinese calendar: 己酉年 (Earth Rooster); 2927 or 2720 — to — 庚戌年 (Metal Dog); 2928 or 2721
- Coptic calendar: −54 – −53
- Discordian calendar: 1396
- Ethiopian calendar: 222–223
- Hebrew calendar: 3990–3991
- Hindu calendars
- Vikram Samvat: 286–287
- Shaka Samvat: 151–152
- Kali Yuga: 3330–3331
- Holocene calendar: 10230
- Iranian calendar: 392 BP – 391 BP
- Islamic calendar: 404 BH – 403 BH
- Javanese calendar: 108–109
- Julian calendar: 230; CCXXX
- Korean calendar: 2563
- Minguo calendar: 1682 before ROC 民前1682年
- Nanakshahi calendar: −1238
- Seleucid era: 541/542 AG
- Thai solar calendar: 772–773
- Tibetan calendar: ས་མོ་བྱ་ལོ་ (female Earth-Bird); 356 or −25 or −797 — to — ལྕགས་ཕོ་ཁྱི་ལོ་ (male Iron-Dog); 357 or −24 or −796

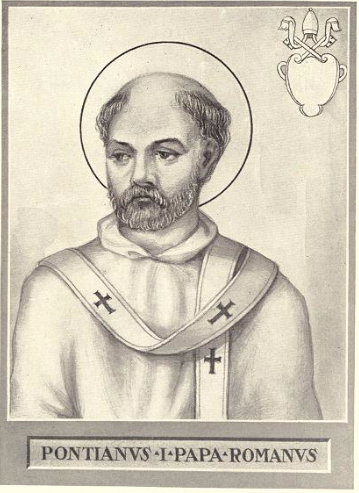
Pope Pontian, elected this year

Year 230 (CCXXX) was a common year starting on Friday of the Julian calendar. At the time, it was known as the Year of the Consulship of Agricola and Clementinus (or, less frequently, year 983 Ab urbe condita). The denomination 230 for this year has been used since the early medieval period, when the Anno Domini calendar era became the prevalent method in Europe for naming years.

== Events ==
=== By place ===
==== Roman Empire ====
- Emperor Alexander Severus decides that Thessaly should be a separate province from Macedonia. He increases taxes, in order to maintain the war against the Sassanids, and strengthen the defenses of the Roman Empire.

==== Persian Empire ====
- King Ardashir I of the Persian Empire invades the Roman province of Mesopotamia, and unsuccessfully besieges the fortress town of Nisibis (Turkey). His army threatens the border outposts of Syria and Cappadocia.
- Alexander Severus assembles the Roman army, and establishes his headquarters at Antioch. He attempts a diplomatic solution, but the Persians decline and choose war.

==== Korea ====
- Jobun becomes king of the Korean kingdom of Silla.

=== By topic ===
==== Religion ====
- July 21 – Pope Pontian succeeds Pope Urban I, as the 18th pope of Rome.
- Patriarch Castinus succeeds Ciriacus I as patriarch Constantinople.
- Seventy bishops hold the council of the Christian Church of Africa.

== Births ==
- Gaius Vibius Volusianus, Roman emperor (d. 253)
- Marcus Aurelius Carus, Roman emperor (d. 283)

== Deaths ==
- May 23 – Urban I, bishop of Rome (b. 175)
- July 9 – Bian, Chinese empress dowager (b. 159)
- Go Uru, Korean prime minister
- Liang Xi, Chinese official and politician
- Marius Maximus, Roman consul and biographer
- Naehae of Silla, Korean ruler
- Wu Zhi, Chinese official and general (b. 177)
- Zhang Wen, Chinese official and politician (b. 193)
- Zhang Yi, Chinese official and politician (b. 167)
- Zhong Yao, Chinese official and calligrapher (b. 151)
