= 181 =

181 may refer to:

- 181 (number)
- 181 BC
- AD 181
- 181 (film), a 2022 Indian Tamil-language horror film
- 181 (New Jersey bus)
- 181 Eucharis, a main-belt asteroid
- 181 Fremont, a skyscraper in San Francisco, California
- 181 series, a Japanese train series
- Antonov 181, a Soviet experimental aircraft
- UFC 181, a mixed martial arts event held in Las Vegas, Nevada
- Volkswagen Type 181, a four-door convertible

== See also ==
- Flight 181 (disambiguation)
