= Dong'ou (disambiguation) =

Dong'ou or Eastern Ou was an ancient former kingdom in Zhejiang, China.

Dong'ou (东瓯/東甌) may also refer to:

- Wenzhou, former capital of Dong'ou Kingdom
- Wenzhounese, a dialect of Wu Chinese
- Dong'ou Subdistrict (东瓯街道), a subdistrict of Wenzhou
