= Southward expansion of the Han dynasty =

Series of Chinese military campaigns by the Han dynasty

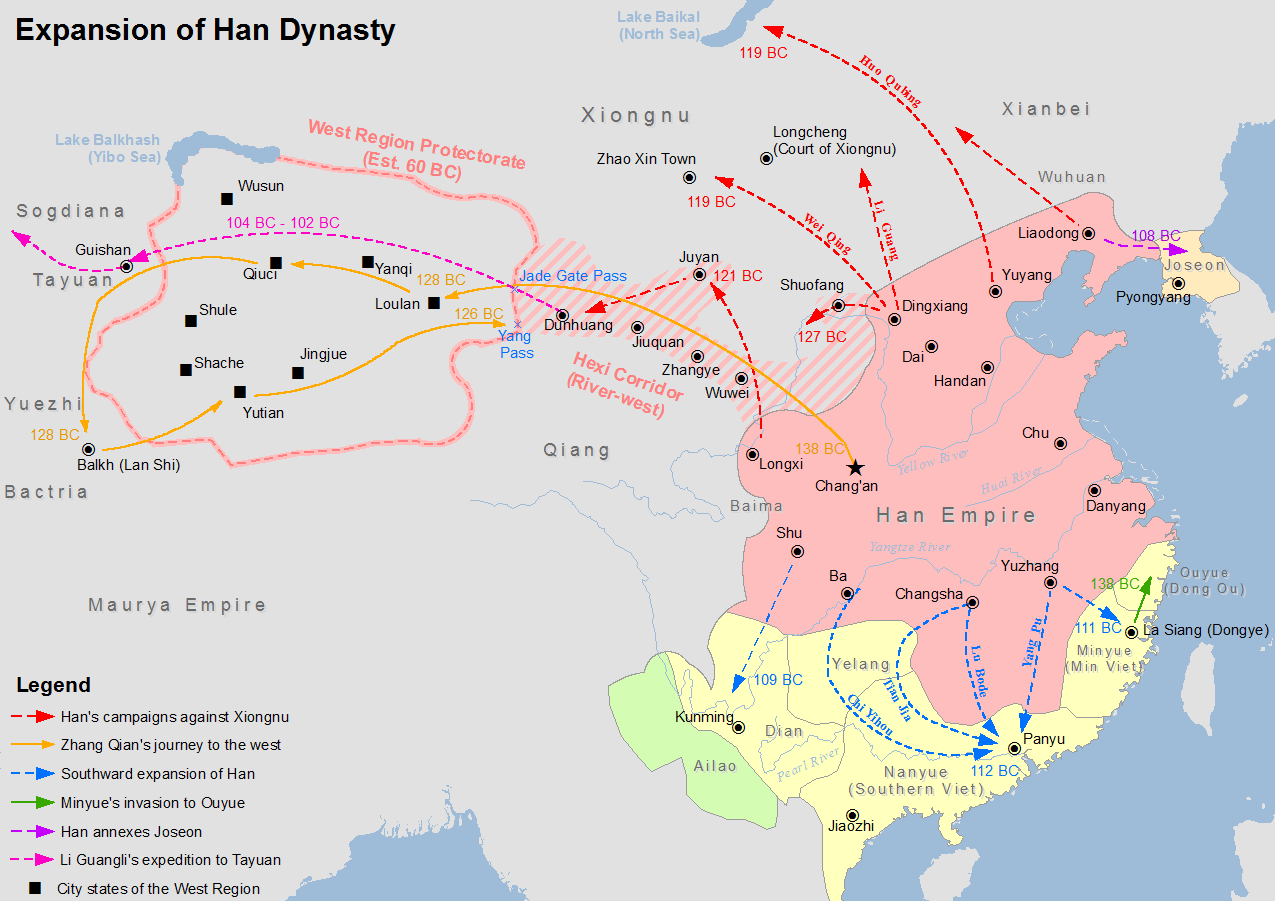
- Map of the expansion of the Han dynasty in 2nd century BC
Date	2nd century BC
Location	Southern Zhejiang, Fujian, Guangdong, Guangxi, Guizhou, Yunnan and Northern Vietnam
Result	Han victory: Cultural assimilation and displacement of the Baiyue and Dian tribes by the Han dynasty; Han Chinese settlement and migration southward; Han Chinese contact and trade with various Southeast Asian states

Belligerents
Han dynasty Dong'ou; Yelang	Nanyue; Minyue; Dian

The southward expansion of the Han dynasty was a series of military campaigns and expeditions by the Han dynasty in modern-day Southern China and Northern Vietnam. Military expansion to the south began under the previous Qin dynasty and continued during the Han era. Campaigns were dispatched to conquer the Baiyue tribes, leading to the Han dynasty's annexation of Minyue in 135 BC and 111 BC, Nanyue in 111 BC, and Dian in 109 BC.

Han Chinese culture took root into the newly conquered territories and the Baiyue and Dian tribes were eventually assimilated or displaced by the Han Empire. Evidence of Han dynasty influences are apparent in artifacts excavated in the Baiyue tombs of modern southern China. This sphere of influence eventually extended to various ancient Southeast Asian states, where contact led to the spread of Han Chinese culture, trade and political diplomacy. The increased demand for Chinese silk also led to the establishment of the Silk Road connecting Europe, the Near East, and China.

== Background ==
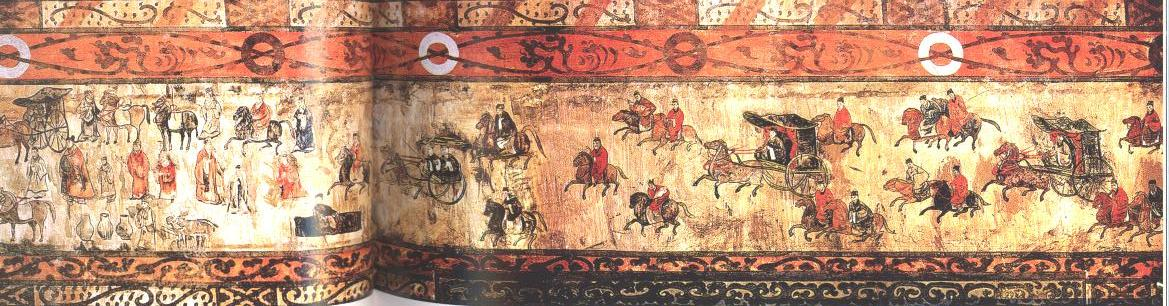
Mural showing cavalry and chariots, from the Dahuting Tomb (Chinese: 打虎亭汉墓; pinyin: Dahuting Han mu) of the late Eastern Han Dynasty (25–220 AD), located in Zhengzhou, Henan province, China

Military campaigns against the Baiyue began under the Qin, the dynasty that preceded the Han. The First Emperor of the Qin craved for the resources of the Baiyue and ordered military expeditions against the region between 221 and 214 BC. He sent a large contingent of soldiers against Lingnan in 214 BC, comprising conscripted merchants and soldiers. Military garrisons were installed, the Lingqu Canal was constructed, and new areas were placed under Qin administration. The collapse of the Qin caused the dissolution of Qin administration in southern China. Indigenous Yue kingdoms emerged in the former Qin territories, including the Nanyue kingdom in Guangxi, Guangdong, and Vietnam, Minyue in Fujian, and Eastern Ou in Zhejiang.

Supported by the Han military, Minyue was established in 202 BC and Eastern Ou in 192 BC after the fall of the Qin dynasty. Zhao Tuo, a former Chinese commander of the Qin, established Nanyue in 208 BC after the death of the emperor Qin Shi Huang. Emperor Gaozu, first emperor of the Han dynasty, approved Zhao Tuo's new title as king. Zhao was born in the city of Zhending in Central China, and the ruling class of the new kingdom was composed of Chinese officials from the former Qin dynasty. In 180 BC, Zhao offered to submit as a vassal state and the Han accepted, a decision partly based on his family's northern Han Chinese ancestry.

== Military campaigns ==
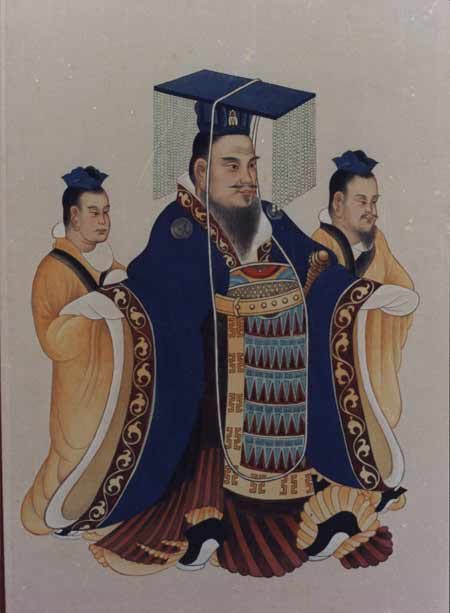
By 111 BC, Emperor Wu of Han successfully conquered Nanyue and annexed it into the Han empire.

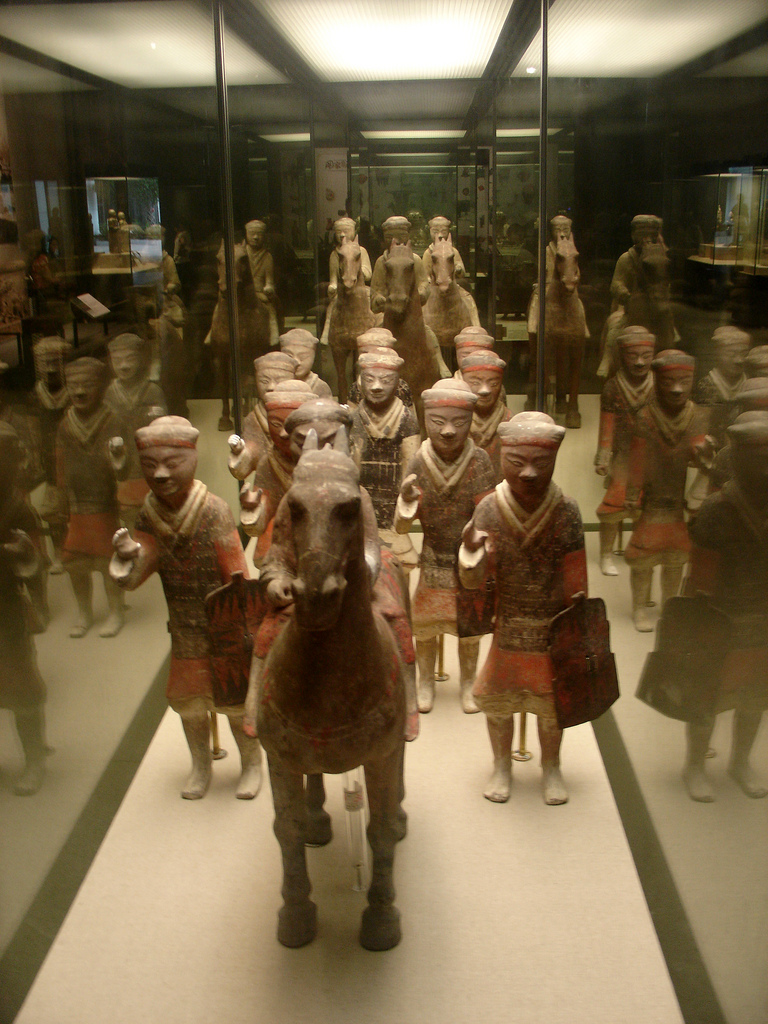
Painted ceramic statues of one Chinese cavalryman and ten infantrymen with armor, shields, and missing weapons in the foreground, and three more cavalrymen in the rear, from the tomb of Emperor Jing of Han (r. 157–141 BC), now located at the Hainan Provincial Museum

=== Campaigns against Minyue and Eastern Ou ===
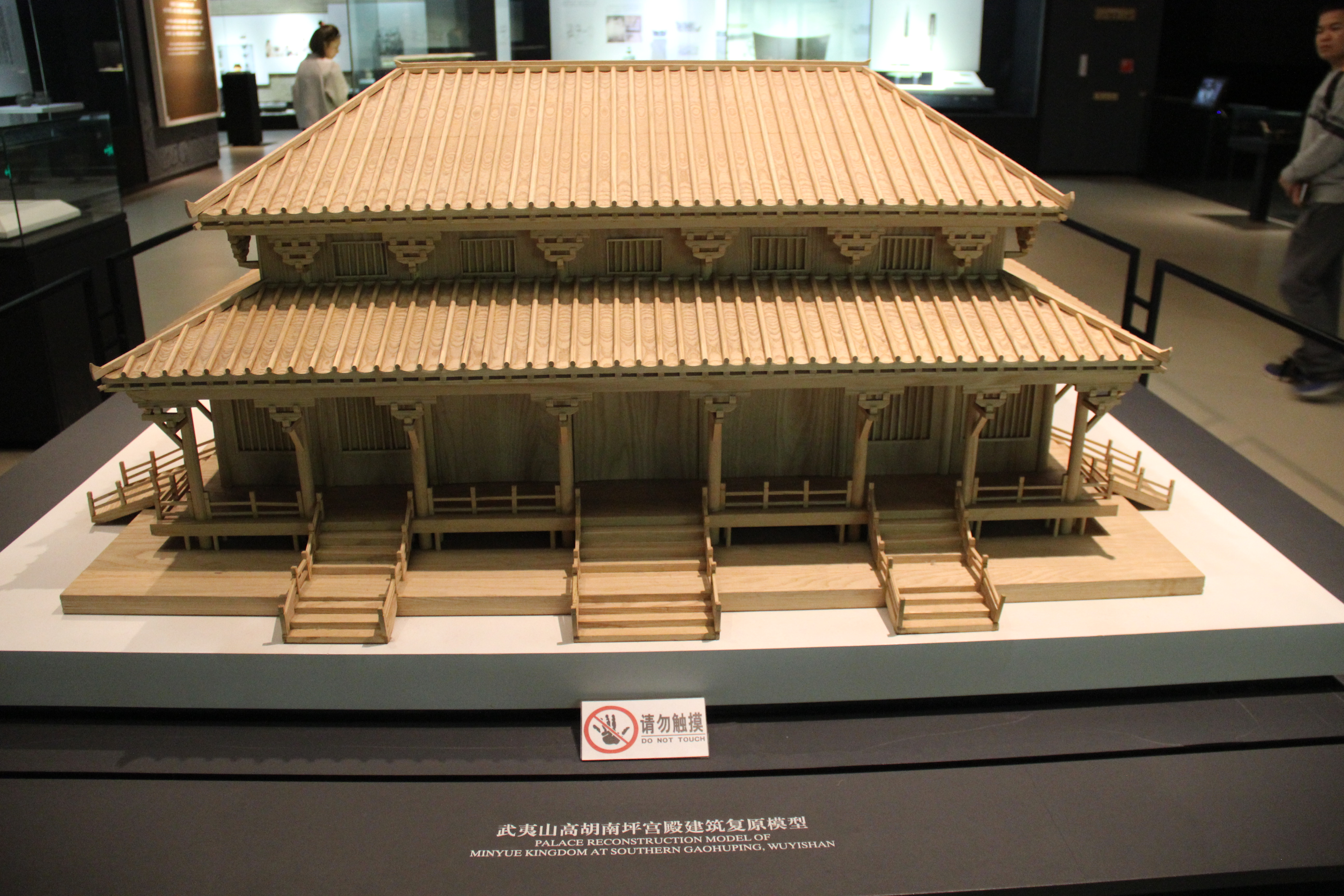
Model recreation of the palace of Minyue at Gaohuping.

Military campaigns were launched against the Baiyue under the reign of the Han emperor Wu. The Eastern Ou Kingdom requested Han military assistance when Minyue invaded the kingdom in 138 BC. Supreme commander Tian Fen opposed Han intervention. Tian told the emperor that the Yue tribes could not be trusted. Battles between the Yue tribes occurred frequently, and Tian believed that protecting them was not a responsibility of the Han court. The Han official Zhuang Zhu convinced the emperor to intervene in the war. Zhuang's argument was based on the emperor's role as the Son of Heaven, a concept in Chinese political philosophy. In Sima Qian's Records of the Grand Historian, Zhuang is reported to have said:

The only thing we should worry about is whether we have strength enough to rescue them and virtue enough to command their loyalty... Now a small country has come to report its distress to the Son of Heaven. If he does not save it, to whom can it turn for aid? And how can the Son of Heaven claim that the rulers of all other states are like sons to him if he ignores their pleases?

The Minyue surrendered after a Han naval force led by Zhuang Zhu was dispatched from Shaoxing in northern Zhejiang, and withdrew from Eastern Ou. The Yue tribes of Eastern Ou were transferred to the north, between the Yangtze River and Huai River.

A second intervention was launched in 135 BC after Minyue, ruled by Zou Ying, invaded Nanyue, ruled by Zhao Mo. Nanyue had been a Han vassal since 180 BC. Zhao asked the Han for their support, and the emperor responded by sending an army led by Wang Hui and Han Anguo against Minyue.

Zou Ying was assassinated with a spear by his younger brother Zou Yushan, who plotted against the ruler with the royal family and prime minister. Yushan beheaded the corpse and gave the head to a messenger, who delivered it to Wang as a sign of Minyue's surrender. After the assassination, Minyue was succeeded by a state divided into a dual monarchy composed of the kingdom of Minyue, controlled by a Han proxy ruler, and the kingdom of Dongyue, ruled by Zou Yushan.

As general Yang Pu returned north with his soldiers after the Han–Nanyue War in 111 BC, he requested the emperor's permission to annex Dongyue. The emperor refused after he considered the morale of the troops. Zou Yushan had promised to supply an army to assist the Han in their war against the Nanyue. The army never arrived and Zou blamed the weather conditions, while secretly maintaining a diplomatic relationship with Nanyue.

Zou began a rebellion against the Han after learning of Yang's plot against him. A Han military campaign was dispatched and led by General Han Yue, General Yang Pu, military commander Wang Wenshu, and two marquises of Yue ancestry. The revolt was repressed and the Han annexed Dongyue in the last months of 111 BC, conquering the remaining territory of the former Minyue. Sima Qian records that the entire population of Dongyue was exiled, a claim that is implausible.

=== Campaign against Nanyue ===
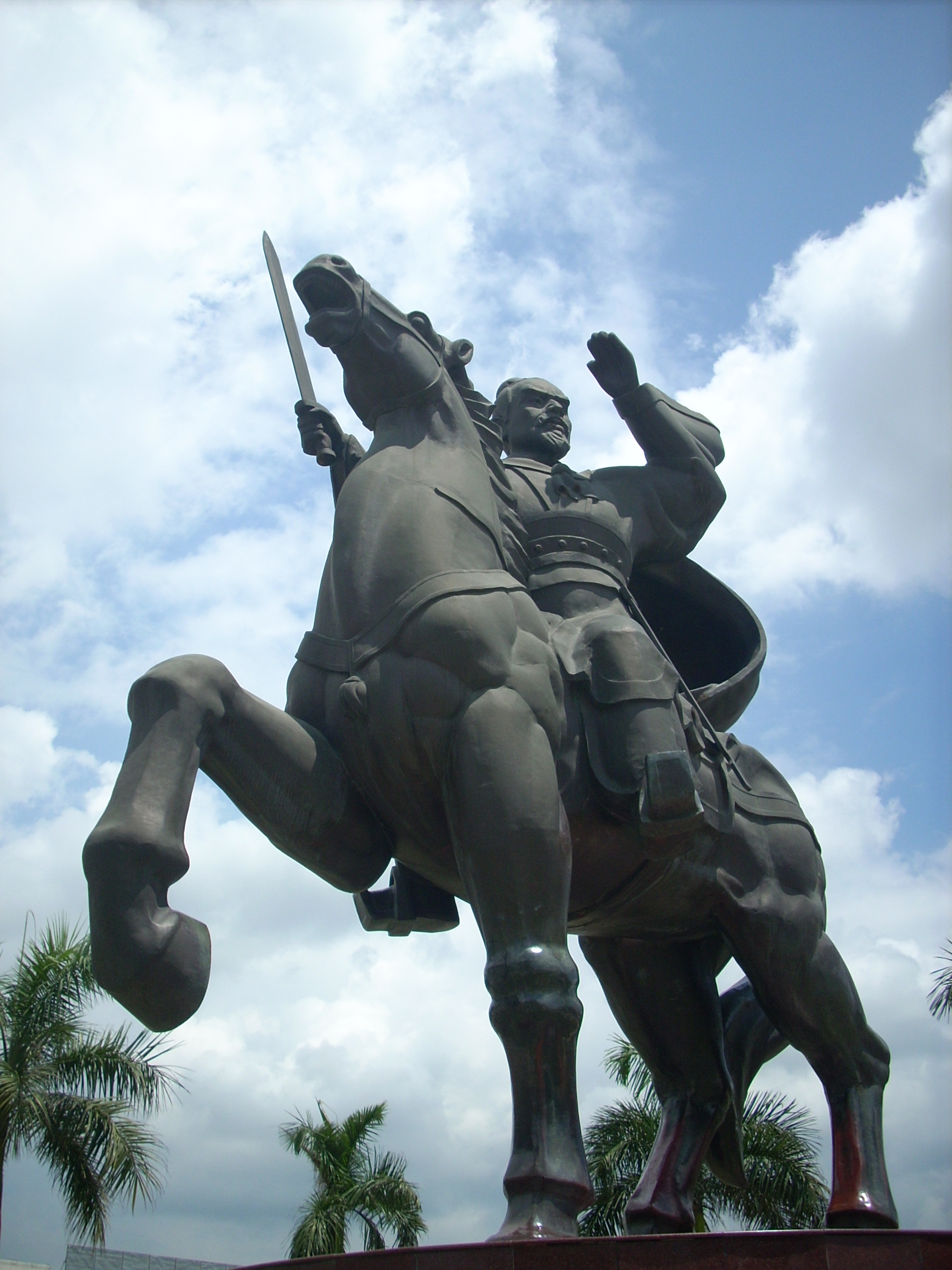
Zhao Tuo, the founder of Nanyue kingdom in southern China and northern Vietnam.

In the 110s BC, Jiushi (樛氏), the empress dowager of Nanyue, wife of the deceased Zhao Yingqi and a native Han Chinese, mooted the unification of Nanyue with Han China. This proposal was met with resistance in the Nanyue nobility which, although nominally tributary to the Han, had not paid tribute in years. The queen was executed by Lü Jia, leader of those who had opposed her, in the summer of 112 BC.

The Han dynasty took umbrage at the diplomats killed with her and saw this event as an act of rebellion. Emperor Wu sent a military campaign consisting of 2,000 soldiers led by General Han Qianqiu to quell the revolt. The general died in battle and the Han forces lost. The second campaign, led by the generals Lu Bode and Yang Pu, was dispatched by sea with 100,000 soldiers in the fall of 112 BC. They reached the city of Panyu, located in modern Guangzhou, in 111–110 BC and defeated the rebels.

Lingnan was once again brought under Chinese control, and nine Chinese commanderies were created to administer Guangdong, the island of Hainan, and the Red River Delta of northern Vietnam. The two Han commanderies located in Hainan were abandoned in 82 BC and 46 BC, despite the Han government's interest in the area's rare resources.

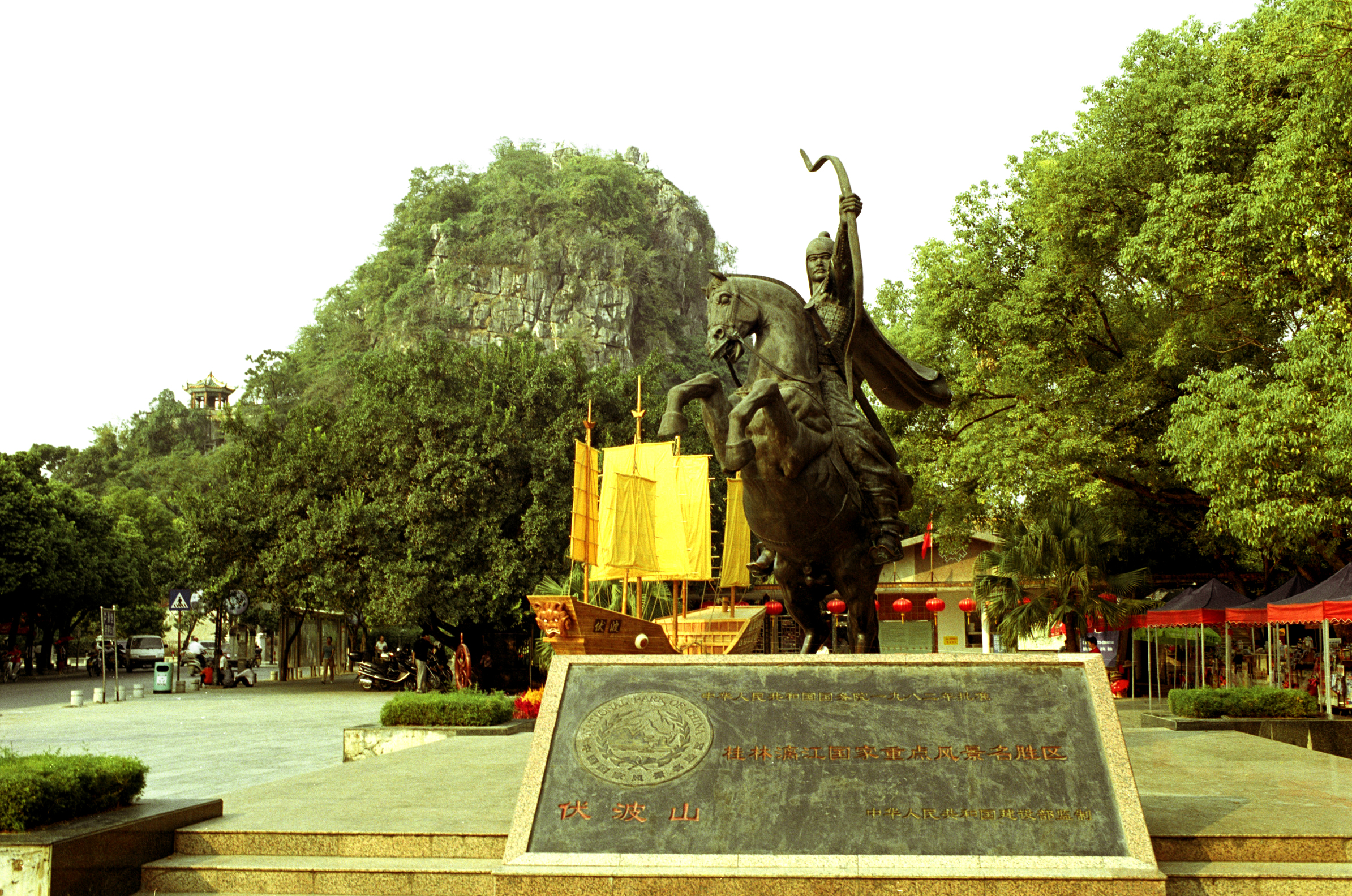
Ma Yuan's statue on Mount Fubo, Guilin

In the early years of the Eastern Han, following the usurpation of Wang Mang and the re-establishment of the Han, the tribal elites of Nanyue remained loyal to the Han. In 40 AD, revolts against Han rule were led by the Trung sisters near the Red River Delta. The rebellion was defeated in 43 by the general Ma Yuan, a participant in the battles that followed Wang Mang's usurpation.

The Han reestablished control of Nanyue. The Trung sisters were executed or killed during the fighting. In popular accounts, they vanished in the sky, fell sick, or took their own lives by jumping into a river and drowning. Violence in the region continued, and there were seven periods of unrest between 100 and 184. A new strategy was adopted, orchestrated by the official Li Gu, that sought to appoint honest officials, exile hostile tribes, and pit tribal leaders against each other. The strategy was only partially successful.

=== Campaign against Dian ===
In 135 BC, Tang Meng led the earliest Han expedition against Dian, establishing the Jianwei commandery in southwestern China. The Dian tribes were involved in the trade of livestock, horses, fruit, and slaves, and was attractive to the Han because of their resources and metalworking expertise. Trade routes between Dian and the rest of the Han empire were opened up by Han soldiers. The Han continued their expansion northward, and annexed the territory near Shu.

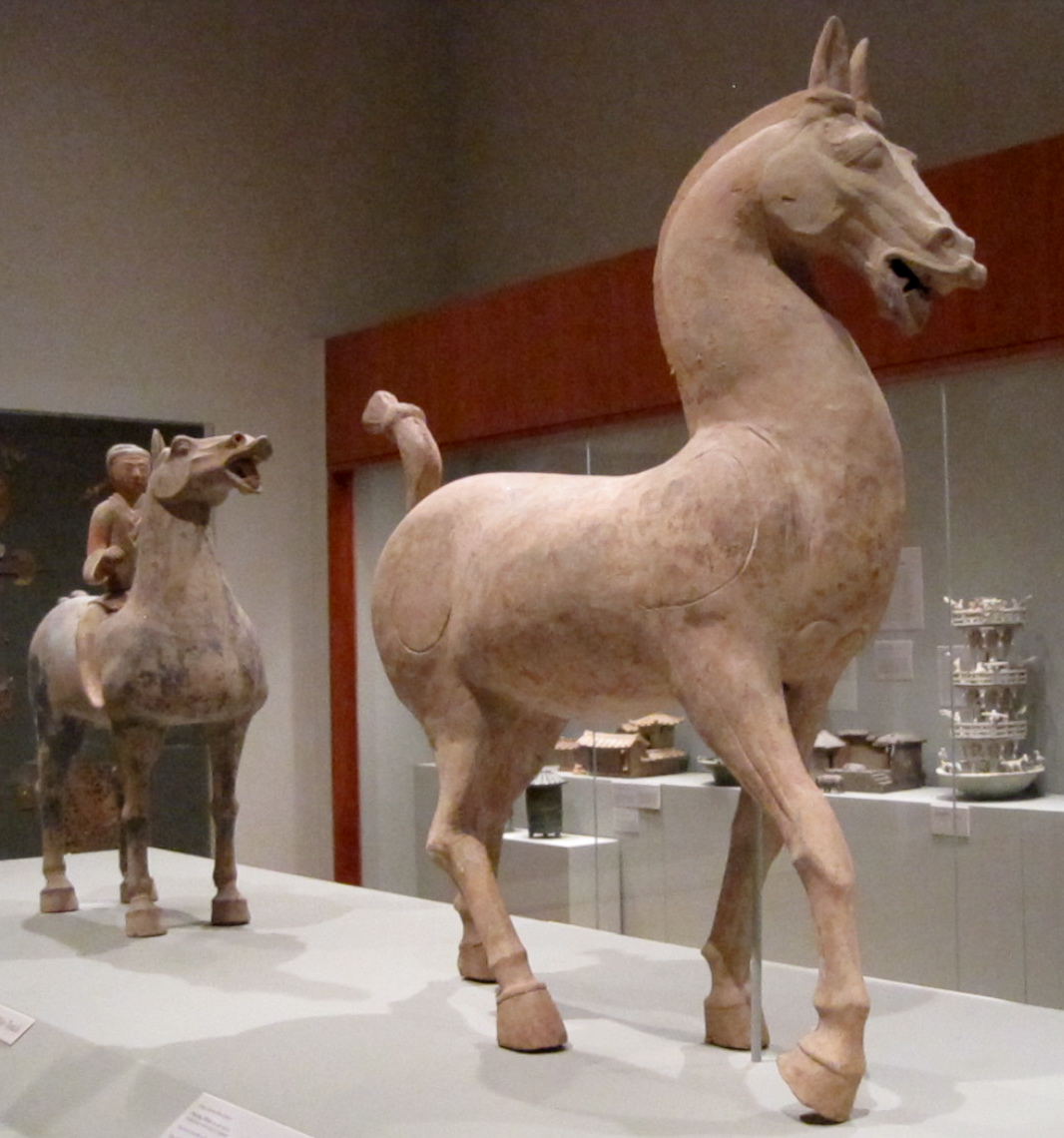
Ceramic statues of a prancing horse (foreground) and a cavalryman on horseback (background), Eastern Han Dynasty (25–220 AD)

Due to the Han–Xiongnu War on the north, the rising cost of administration in the distant state led to the Han abandoning the commandery. A group of Chinese explorers were captured by the Dian for four years. They were part of an expedition traveling southwards to establish an alternative trade route for the goods reported in Central Asian markets in 122 BC.

Dian was conquered during a military campaign launched by Emperor Wu of Han in 109 BC, and the Yizhou commandery was established in the former kingdom. Archaeologists discovered the king of Dian's imperial seal inscribed by the Han, confirming Dian's surrender and status as a subject of the Han. The Dian led a series of unsuccessful rebellions against Han rule, beginning with two revolts in 86 BC and 83 BC. Chen Li, governor of the Zangge commandery, crushed a rebellion in 28–25 BC. Under Wang Mang's reign as usurper of the Han throne between 9–23 AD, hostilities in southwestern China persisted. Wang sent military campaigns to quell the unrest. Seventy percent of the soldiers in one campaign died from illness. Another campaign, comprising 100,000 men and with double the supplies, was not fruitful. Rebellions continued in 42-45 and 176.

The Han expanded further during Emperor Ming's reign (57–75 AD). The new commandery of Yongchang (永昌郡) was established in what is modern Baoshan, Yunnan in the former Dian Kingdom. The Dian tribes west of Yuexi/Yuesui Commandery (越巂, modern Xichang in southern Sichuan) submitted to Han rule in 114 AD. Emperor Huan (r. 146–168) encouraged the cultural assimilation of the tribes during his reign between. Under Emperor Huangti, sinicization of the Dian involved the teaching of Chinese ethics and Han Chinese culture was promoted in Yunnan. Despite periodic unrest, the Dian Kingdom was eventually absorbed into the Han Empire. Conquered by the Han dynasty, Han Chinese settlers began moving into the lowlands once inhabited by the Dian. Over the centuries, the Dian were assimilated by the Han Chinese and were virtually extinct by the 11th century AD.

== Historical significance ==
=== Chinese migration and cultural assimilation ===
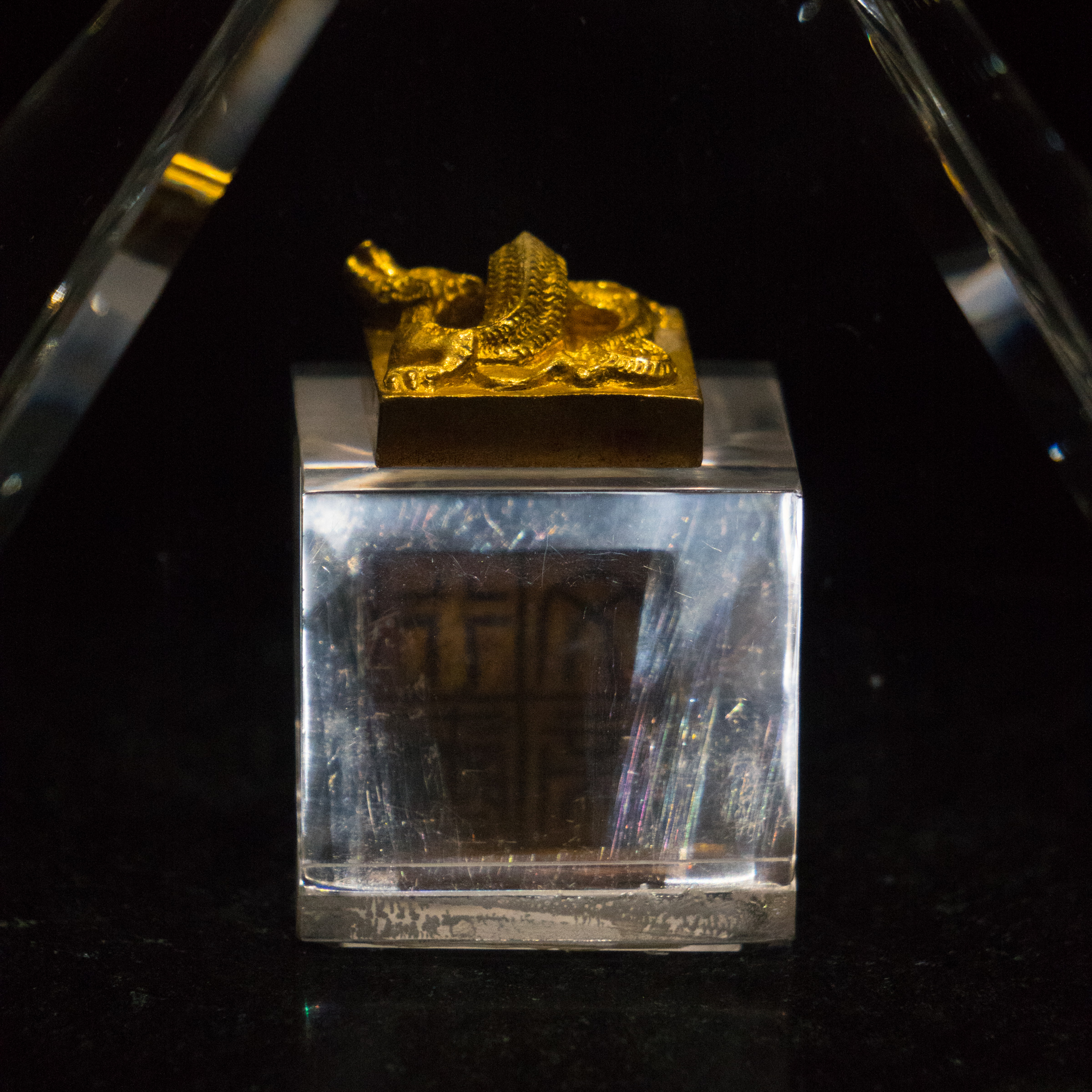
The imperial seal of Nanyue king Zhao Mo. Artifacts uncovered in Nanyue sites show a mixture of Chinese and Yue elements.

Han Chinese migration from northern and central China populated Yunnan and Guangdong. The political turmoil that followed Wang Mang's usurpation led to another wave of Chinese migration. Han settlers and soldiers from the north were affected by diseases common in tropical regions, such as malaria and schistosomiasis.

Sinicization of the Yue and Dian tribes was brought about by a combination of Han imperial military power, regular Han Chinese settlement and an influx of Han Chinese refugees. The military invasions and an influx Han Chinese immigrants created a culture that merged Han Chinese traditions with indigenous elements. Evidence from modern archaeological digs in the area reveal the extent of Han Chinese influence. Han dynasty tombs in Guangzhou, Guangdong show that the native tools and ceramics were gradually replaced by those modeled after Chinese styles by the Western Han. Excavations from the period have uncovered bronze mirrors, stoves, wells, incense burners, tripods, and lanterns manufactured in the style of the Han Chinese.

Cultural assimilation in Guangxi and Guizhou happened during the late Western Han and occurred later than in Guangdong. As in Guangdong, a number of Han-style mirrors, coins, ceramics, bronze, iron, and lacquerware were discovered in the region's tombs.

Modern Yunnan in southwestern China was annexed into the Han Empire after the establishment of a Chinese prefecture in 109 BC. The growing influence of Chinese culture is apparent in excavated Dian artifacts, and coins, ceramics, mirrors, and bronzes have been discovered in Dian manufactured with Han stylistic elements. Dian art adopted the aesthetics of Han imports and by 100, the indigenous Dian culture had largely disappeared. Northern Chinese culture had become largely ingrained in the south. The expansion of China from the North China Plain to the south, a process that began in the Qin dynasty, had reached its height under the Han.

=== Trade and foreign contact ===
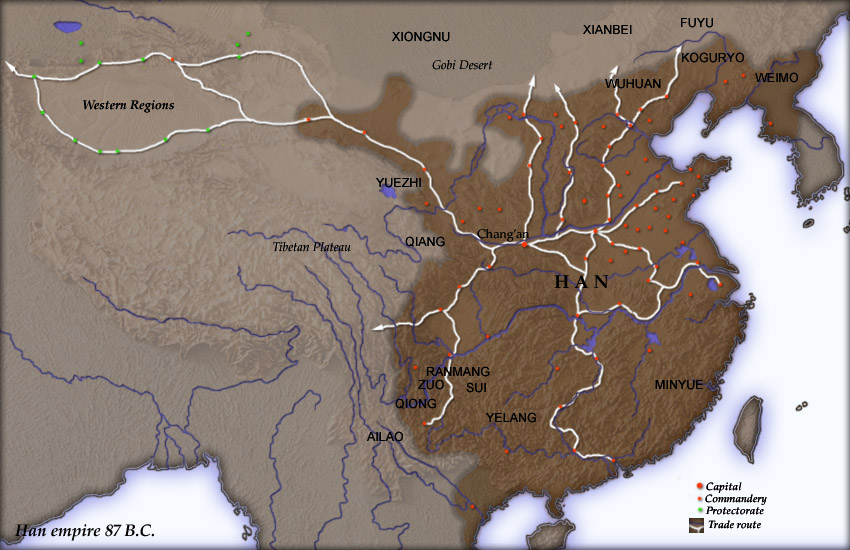
Map of the provinces, commanderies, and protectorates of the Han dynasty in 87 BC.

The southward expansion of the Han dynasty brought the empire into contact with the civilizations of Southeast Asia. Chinese cultural and technological influence spread to nearby Southeast Asian kingdoms. Remnants of Chinese pottery from the Han dynasty have been excavated in Sumatra, Borneo, and Java that date from the 1st century. Archaeologists have also discovered bronze axes in Cambodia that were based on the design of Chinese axes.

Han dynasty emperors and their successors maintained commercial and diplomatic ties with various South and Southeast Asian kingdoms. Han dynasty ships traveled as far as India, expanding the horizon for new foreign markets for Chinese goods and services through maritime trade within the orbit of the Indian Ocean. Trade relationships were also established between China and foreign empires through the conquered territories. Trade connected China with the Indian Mauryan, Sātavāhana and Shunga Empires, the Persian Parthian Empire, and the European Roman Mediterranean. Roman dancers and entertainers were sent to Luoyang as a gift to China from a Burmese kingdom in 120. A kingdom referred to in the Book of Han as Huangzhi delivered a rhinoceros in the year 2 AD as a tribute. An Indian embassy arrived in China between 89 and 105. Roman merchants from the province of Syria visited Nanyue in 166, Nanjing in 226, and Luoyang in 284. Foreign products have been found at archaeological sites excavating tombs in southern China. Originating with the overseas demand for Chinese silk, the ancient Silk Road trade routes were responsible for the transmission of goods and services as well as ideas between ancient Europe, the Near East, and China.

== See also ==
- Military of the Han dynasty
- Han dynasty in Inner Asia
