= AD 91 =

AD 91 in various calendars
- Gregorian calendar: AD 91; XCI
- Ab urbe condita: 844
- Assyrian calendar: 4841
- Balinese saka calendar: 12–13
- Bengali calendar: −503 – −502
- Berber calendar: 1041
- Buddhist calendar: 635
- Burmese calendar: −547
- Byzantine calendar: 5599–5600
- Chinese calendar: 庚寅年 (Metal Tiger); 2788 or 2581 — to — 辛卯年 (Metal Rabbit); 2789 or 2582
- Coptic calendar: −193 – −192
- Discordian calendar: 1257
- Ethiopian calendar: 83–84
- Hebrew calendar: 3851–3852
- Hindu calendars
- Vikram Samvat: 147–148
- Shaka Samvat: 12–13
- Kali Yuga: 3191–3192
- Holocene calendar: 10091
- Iranian calendar: 531 BP – 530 BP
- Islamic calendar: 547 BH – 546 BH
- Javanese calendar: N/A
- Julian calendar: AD 91; XCI
- Korean calendar: 2424
- Minguo calendar: 1821 before ROC 民前1821年
- Nanakshahi calendar: −1377
- Seleucid era: 402/403 AG
- Thai solar calendar: 633–634
- Tibetan calendar: ལྕགས་ཕོ་སྟག་ལོ་ (male Iron-Tiger); 217 or −164 or −936 — to — ལྕགས་མོ་ཡོས་ལོ་ (female Iron-Hare); 218 or −163 or −935

AD 91 (XCI) was a common year starting on Saturday of the Julian calendar. At the time, it was known as the Year of the Consulship of Glabrio and Traianus (or, less frequently, year 844 Ab urbe condita). The denomination AD 91 for this year has been used since the early medieval period, when the Anno Domini calendar era became the prevalent method in Europe for naming years.

== Events ==
=== By place ===
==== Roman Empire ====
- Manius Acilius Glabrio and Marcus Ulpius Traianus become Roman Consuls.
- Pliny the Younger is named a tribunus plebis.

==== Asia ====
- Ban Chao is made protector-general of the Western Regions.

=== By topic ===
==== Art and Science ====
- Rome is described by Statius in his poems.

== Deaths ==
- Gaius Vipstanus Apronianus, Roman politician, governor
- Julia Flavia, daughter of Titus, lover of his brother Domitian (b. AD 64)
- Publius Valerius Patruinus, Roman politician, governor
