= AD 151 =

151 in various calendars
- Gregorian calendar: 151; CLI
- Ab urbe condita: 904
- Assyrian calendar: 4901
- Balinese saka calendar: 72–73
- Bengali calendar: −443 – −442
- Berber calendar: 1101
- Buddhist calendar: 695
- Burmese calendar: −487
- Byzantine calendar: 5659–5660
- Chinese calendar: 庚寅年 (Metal Tiger); 2848 or 2641 — to — 辛卯年 (Metal Rabbit); 2849 or 2642
- Coptic calendar: −133 – −132
- Discordian calendar: 1317
- Ethiopian calendar: 143–144
- Hebrew calendar: 3911–3912
- Hindu calendars
- Vikram Samvat: 207–208
- Shaka Samvat: 72–73
- Kali Yuga: 3251–3252
- Holocene calendar: 10151
- Iranian calendar: 471 BP – 470 BP
- Islamic calendar: 486 BH – 484 BH
- Javanese calendar: 26–27
- Julian calendar: 151; CLI
- Korean calendar: 2484
- Minguo calendar: 1761 before ROC 民前1761年
- Nanakshahi calendar: −1317
- Seleucid era: 462/463 AG
- Thai solar calendar: 693–694
- Tibetan calendar: ལྕགས་ཕོ་སྟག་ལོ་ (male Iron-Tiger); 277 or −104 or −876 — to — ལྕགས་མོ་ཡོས་ལོ་ (female Iron-Hare); 278 or −103 or −875

Year 151 (CLI) was a common year starting on Thursday of the Julian calendar. At the time, it was known as the Year of the Consulship of Condianus and Valerius (or, less frequently, year 904 Ab urbe condita). The denomination 151 for this year has been used since the early medieval period, when the Anno Domini calendar era became the prevalent method in Europe for naming years.

== Events ==
=== By place ===
==== Asia ====
- Mytilene and Smyrna are destroyed by an earthquake.
- First year of Yuanjia of the Chinese Han dynasty.

=== By topic ===
==== Art ====
- Detail from a rubbing of a stone relief in Wu family shrine (Wuliangci), Jiaxiang, Shandong, is made (Han dynasty).

== Births ==
- Annia Galeria Aurelia Faustina, daughter of Marcus Aurelius
- Zhong Yao, Chinese official and calligrapher (d. 230)

== Deaths ==
- Kanishka, Indian ruler of the Kushan Empire
- Novatus, Christian saint (approximate date)
