= 167 =

167 may also refer to:

- 167 (number), the natural number following 166 and preceding 168
- 167 BC
- AD 167
- 167 (New Jersey bus)
- UFC 167
- 167 Urda
- Fieseler Fi 167
- Radical 167
- 167 series
- Kosmos 167
