= Flight 181 =

Flight 181 may refer to:

Listed chronologically

- Lufthansa Flight 181, hijacked on 13 October 1977
- Air India Flight 181, first leg of Air India Flight 182, destroyed by a bomb on 23 June 1985
- EgyptAir Flight 181, hijacked on 29 March 2016
