= AD 159 =

159 in various calendars
- Gregorian calendar: 159; CLIX
- Ab urbe condita: 912
- Assyrian calendar: 4909
- Balinese saka calendar: 80–81
- Bengali calendar: −435 – −434
- Berber calendar: 1109
- Buddhist calendar: 703
- Burmese calendar: −479
- Byzantine calendar: 5667–5668
- Chinese calendar: 戊戌年 (Earth Dog); 2856 or 2649 — to — 己亥年 (Earth Pig); 2857 or 2650
- Coptic calendar: −125 – −124
- Discordian calendar: 1325
- Ethiopian calendar: 151–152
- Hebrew calendar: 3919–3920
- Hindu calendars
- Vikram Samvat: 215–216
- Shaka Samvat: 80–81
- Kali Yuga: 3259–3260
- Holocene calendar: 10159
- Iranian calendar: 463 BP – 462 BP
- Islamic calendar: 477 BH – 476 BH
- Javanese calendar: 35–36
- Julian calendar: 159; CLIX
- Korean calendar: 2492
- Minguo calendar: 1753 before ROC 民前1753年
- Nanakshahi calendar: −1309
- Seleucid era: 470/471 AG
- Thai solar calendar: 701–702
- Tibetan calendar: ས་ཕོ་ཁྱི་ལོ་ (male Earth-Dog); 285 or −96 or −868 — to — ས་མོ་ཕག་ལོ་ (female Earth-Boar); 286 or −95 or −867

Year 159 (CLIX) was a common year starting on Sunday of the Julian calendar. At the time in Roman territories, it was known as the Year of the Consulship of Quintillus and Priscus (or, less frequently, year 912 Ab urbe condita). The denomination 159 for this year has been used since the early medieval period, when the Anno Domini calendar era became the prevalent method in Europe for naming years.

== Events ==
=== By place ===
==== India ====
- In India, the reign of Shivashri Satakarni, as King Satavahana of Andhra, begins.

== Births ==
- December 30 – Lady Bian, wife of Cao Cao (d. 230)
- Annia Aurelia Fadilla, daughter of Marcus Aurelius
- Gordian I, Roman emperor (d. 238)
- Lu Zhi, Chinese general (d. 192)

== Deaths ==
- Liang Ji, Chinese general and regent
- Liang Nüying, Chinese empress
