= Liang Xi =

Cao Wei state official and general (died 230)

- 梁習

Minister of Finance (大司農)
- In office 228 – 230
- Monarch: Cao Rui

Inspector of Bing Province (并州刺史)
- In office 220 – 228
- Monarch: Cao Pi
- In office 206 – 213
- Monarch: Emperor Xian of Han
- Chancellor: Cao Cao (from 208 onwards)

Personal details
- Born: Unknown Zhecheng County, Henan
- Died: 230 (Note: Liang Xi's biography in the Sanguozhi recorded that he died in the 4th year of the Taihe era (227-233) of Cao Rui's reign.)
- Children: Liang Shi
- Occupation: Official
- Courtesy name: Ziyu (子虞)
- Peerage: Marquis of Shenmen Village (申門亭侯)

Liang Xi (died 230), courtesy name Ziyu, was an official of the state of Cao Wei during the Three Kingdoms period of China. He was from Zhe County (柘縣), Chen Commandery (陳郡), which is around present-day Zhecheng County, Henan. He served as the Inspector of Bing Province. At one time, he achieved compliance from the Xiongnu to then settle the frontier and to launch an agricultural sericulture (silk production from silkworm) industry.

He was later promoted to the position of Minister of Finance (大司農) in 228.

== See also ==
- Lists of people of the Three Kingdoms
