= Dong'ou =

Ancient Chinese kingdom

Dong'ou 東甌
- 191 BC
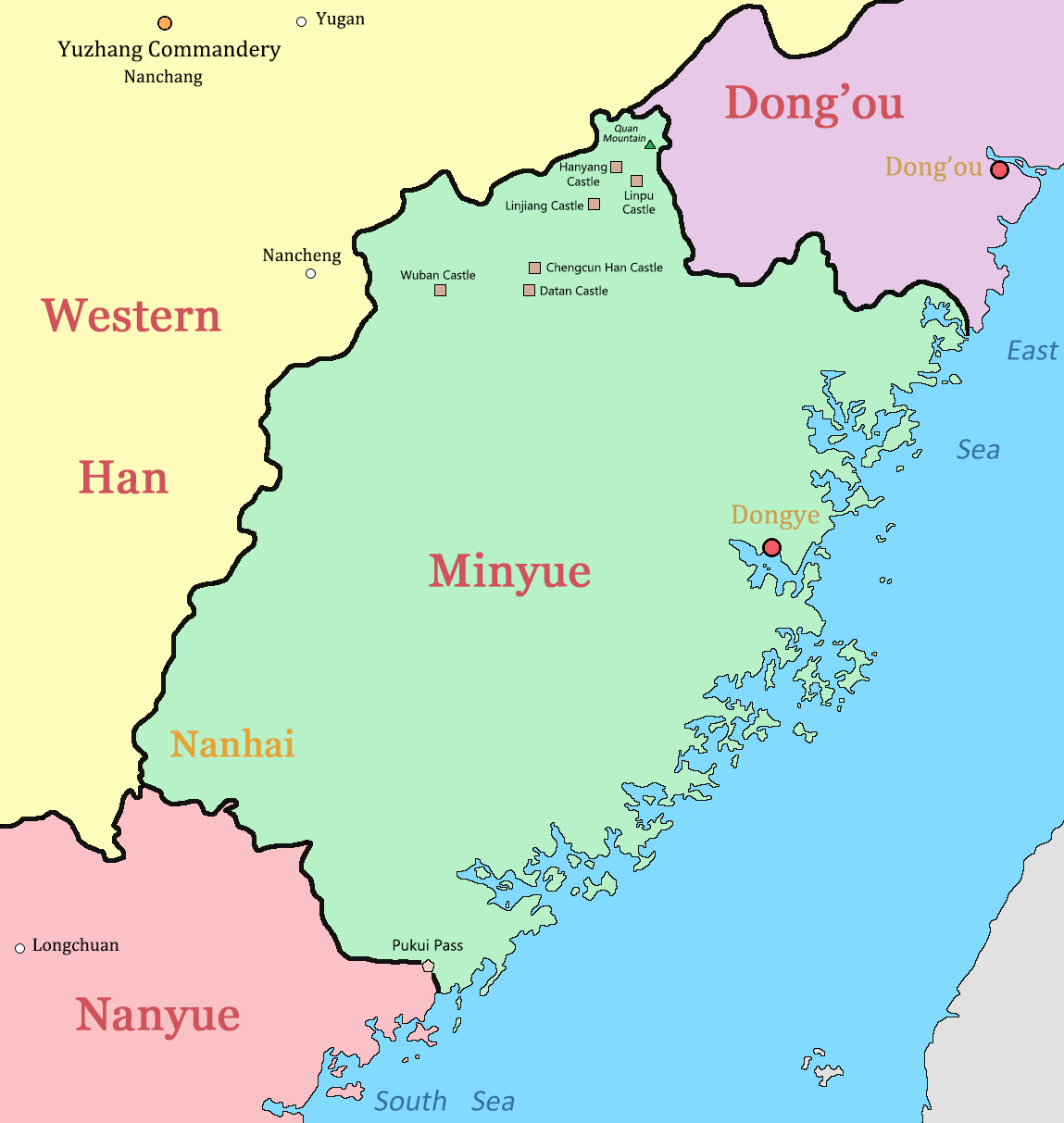
- Map of Dong'ou

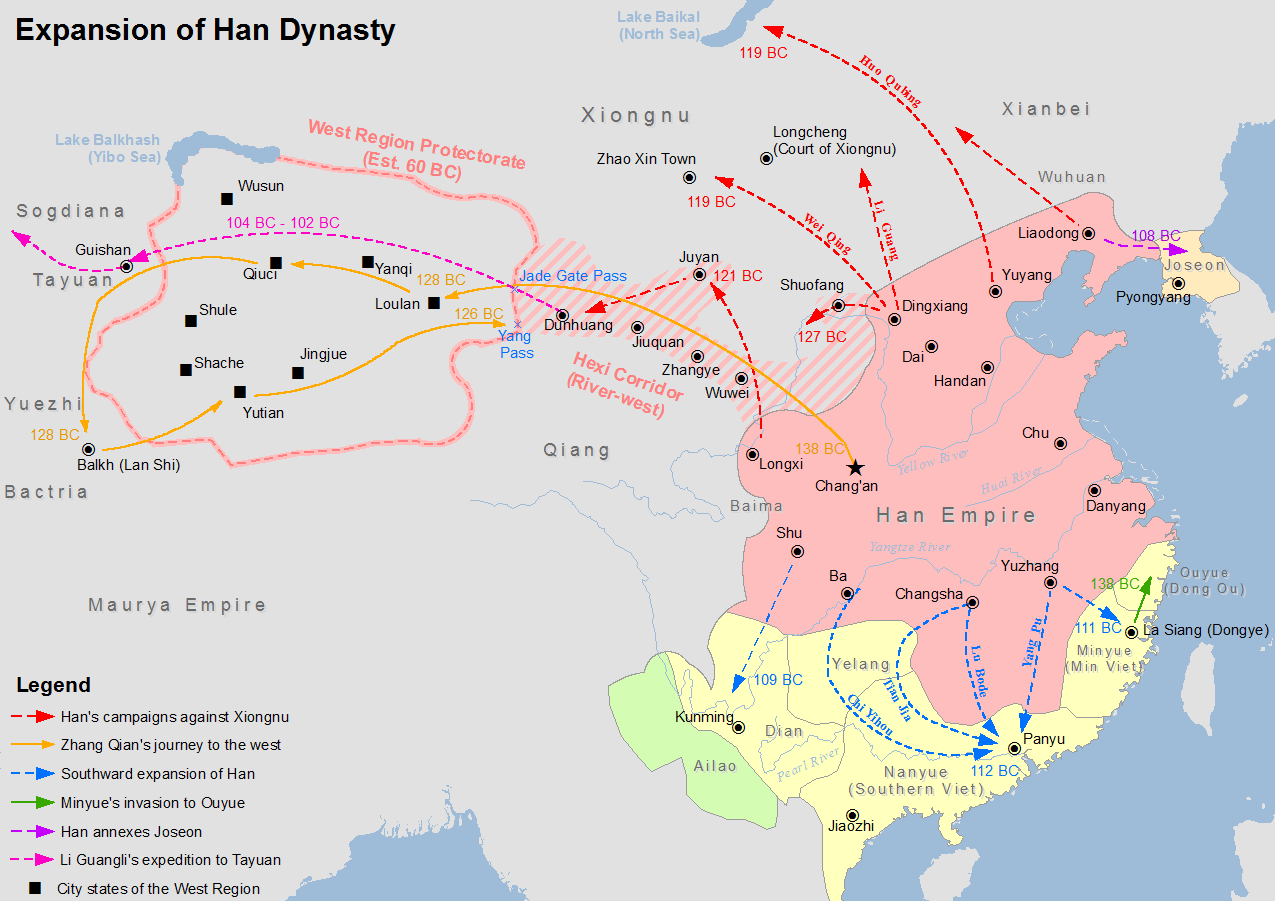
- The location of Dong'ou kingdom before the conquest of the Han dynasty
- Status: Kingdom
- Capital: Dong'ou (modern Wenzhou)
- Government: Monarchy
- King
  - 191–185 BCE: Yao (搖)
  - 185–138 BCE: Zhenfu (貞復)
  - 138–138 BCE: Wang (望)
- History
  - Established: 191 BC
  - Defeated by Minyue: 138 BC
  - Annexed by the Han dynasty: 111 BC
Preceded by	Succeeded by
State of Yue	Han dynasty
- Today part of: China

Dong'ou (traditional Chinese: 東甌; simplified Chinese: 东瓯; pinyin: Dōng'ōu), also known as Ouyue (traditional Chinese: 甌越; simplified Chinese: 瓯越; pinyin: Ōuyuè), was an ancient kingdom in modern Wenzhou, Taizhou, and Lishui of Zhejiang Province, China. The realm of Dong'ou was given to Zou Yao by Emperor Gaozu of Han in 192 BC. During the Han campaigns against Minyue in 138 BC, the king of Dong'ou no longer wished to live in his realm after the incident, having submitted himself in an prostrating gesture, which was indicative of his final acquiescence as a mere supplicant to have him and his people's eventual fates to be absorbed into the Han empire. Dong'ou's territory extended northwest to the Xianxia Mountains, the Dapan Mountains, and the Tiantai Mountains, and south to the border of Zhejiang and Fujian. After Zou Yushan's unsuccessful uprising against General Yang Pu's conspiratorial intentions to subvert him, which aimed to protect Dongyue's independence, the aspiration for autonomous control over Dongyue gradually dissipated during the final months of 111 BC. Zou's uprising was suppressed, prompting the Han dynasty to eventually incorporate Dongyue and the remaining territories of the former Minyue, thereby permanently securing the complete annexation and assimilation of both domains into the Han empire.

== See also ==
- The Taizhou Museum displays an exhibition related to Dong'ou ("Ancient Port of Zhang'an").

== Sources ==
- Lorge, Peter (2012). Graff, David Andrew; Higham, Robin D. S. (eds.). A Military History of China. University Press of Kentucky. ISBN 978-0-8131-3584-7.
- Sima, Qian; Watson, Burton (1993). Records of the Grand Historian: Han Dynasty II. Translation and commentary by Watson. Columbia University Press. ISBN 978-0-231-08166-5.
- Watson, Burton (1993), Records of the Grand Historian by Sima Qian: Han Dynasty II (Revised Edition, Columbia University Press
- Yu, Yingshi (1986). Twitchett, Denis; Loewe, Michael (eds.). Cambridge History of China: Volume I: the Ch'in and Han Empires, 221 B.C. – A.D. 220. University of Cambridge Press. ISBN 978-0-521-24327-8.
