= 80s =

Ninth decade of the first century AD

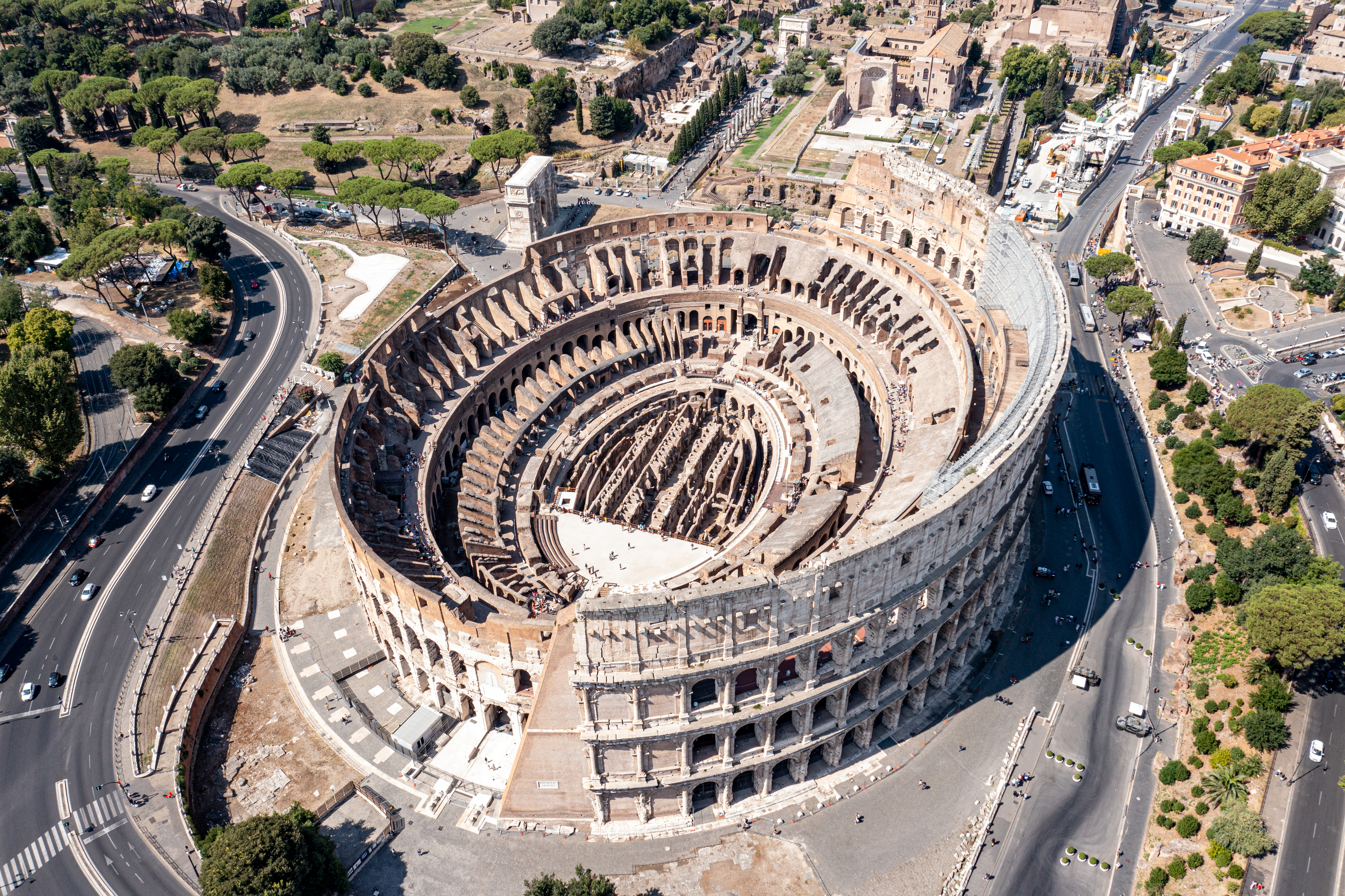
A view of the Colosseum, which held its inaugural games in AD 80.

The 80s was a decade that ran from January 1, AD 80, to December 31, AD 89.

As the decade began, the Parthian Empire was in a phase of division until Pacorus II managed to consolidate his rule, eliminating the two rival contenders for his throne: Vologases II in AD 80 and Artabanus III in AD 81. Domitian became Roman emperor in AD 81: The military campaigns undertaken during his reign were generally defensive in nature, as the Emperor rejected the idea of expansionist warfare. His most significant military contribution was the development of the Limes Germanicus, which encompassed a vast network of roads, forts and watchtowers constructed along the Rhine river to defend the Empire. Nevertheless, several important wars were fought in Gaul, against the Chatti, and across the Danube frontier against the Suebi, the Sarmatians, and the Dacians (see Domitian's Dacian War). In northern Britain, the Romans defeated local tribes in the Battle of Mons Graupius (AD 83). In China, the Han–Xiongnu War continued, with the Battle of the Altai Mountains (AD 89) bringing the Northern Xiongnu to the brink of collapse. The death of Emperor Zhang of Han ended a golden age.

In spring of AD 80, a fire broke out in Rome and burned large parts of the city for three days and three nights. Although the extent of the damage was not as disastrous as during the Great Fire of 64 and crucially spared the many districts of insulae, Cassius Dio records a long list of important public buildings that were destroyed, including Agrippa's Pantheon, the Temple of Jupiter, the Diribitorium, parts of the Theatre of Pompey, and the Saepta Julia among others. Emperor Titus personally compensated for the damaged regions. According to Suetonius, a plague also broke out during the fire. The nature of the disease, however, and the death toll are unknown.

Manning (2008) tentatively estimates the world population in AD 80 to have been 250 million.

== Events ==
=== By place ===
==== Roman Empire ====
- An epidemic afflicts Rome.
- Martial publishes the Liber Spectaculorum.

==== Asia ====
- King Pasa becomes ruler of the Korean kingdom of Silla.

=== By place ===
==== Roman Empire ====
- September 14 – Domitian succeeds his brother Titus as emperor. Domitian is not a soldier like his two predecessors, and his administration is directed towards the reinforcement of a monarchy. By taking the title of Dominus ("lord"), he scandalizes the senatorial aristocracy. Romanisation progresses in the provinces, and life in the cities is greatly improved. Many provincials – Spanish, Gallic, and African – become Senators.
- The Arch of Titus is constructed.
- Pliny the Younger is flamen Divi Augusti (priest in the cult of the Emperor).

=== By topic ===
==== Commerce ====
- The silver content of the Roman denarius rises to 92% under emperor Domitian, up from 81% in the reign of Vitellius.

==== Religion ====
- Possible date of the First Epistle of Peter.

=== By place ===
==== Roman Empire ====
- Emperor Domitian becomes Roman Consul.
- Gnaeus Julius Agricola raises a fleet, and encircles the Celtic tribes beyond the Forth; the Caledonians rise in great numbers against the Romans. They attack the camp of Legio IX Hispana at night, but Agricola sends his cavalry in, and puts them to flight.
- Calgacus unites the Picts (30,000 men) in Scotland, and is made chieftain of the Caledonian Confederacy.
- Dio Chrysostom is banished from Rome, Italy, and Bithynia, after advising one of the Emperor's conspiring relatives.
- Domitian levies Legio I Minervia.

=== By place ===
==== Roman Empire ====
- Possible date of the Battle of Mons Graupius (AD 83 or 84): According to Tacitus, 10,000 Britons and 360 Romans are killed.
- Emperor Domitian fights the Chatti, a Germanic tribe. His victory allows the construction of fortifications (Limes) along the Rhine-frontier.
- The Roman fort Inchtuthil is built in Scotland.
- Domitian is, again, also a Roman Consul.
- Possible date that Demetrius of Tarsus visits an island in the Hebrides populated by holy men, possibly druids.
- In Rome, the castration of slaves is prohibited.

=== By place ===
==== Roman Empire ====
- Possible date of the Battle of Mons Graupius (AD 83 or 84), in which Gnaeus Julius Agricola defeats the Caledonians.
- Emperor Domitian recalls Agricola back to Rome, where he is rewarded with a triumph and the governorship of the Roman province of Africa, but he declines it.
- Pliny the Younger is sevir equitum Romanorum (commander of a cavalry squadron).
- The construction of the limes, a line of Roman fortifications from the Rhine to the Danube, has begun.
- Through his election as consul for ten years and censor for life, Domitian openly subordinates the republican aspect of the state to the monarchical.
- Domitian increases the troops' pay by one third, thus securing their loyalty.

==== Asia ====
- Change from Jianchu to Yuanhe era of the Chinese Eastern Han Dynasty.

=== By place ===
==== Roman Empire ====
- Emperor Domitian repulses a Dacian invasion of Moesia.
- Dacians under Decebalus engage in two wars against the Romans from this year to AD 88 or 89.
- Domitian appoints himself censor for life, which gives him the right to control the Senate. His totalitarian tendencies put the senatorial aristocracy firmly in opposition to him.

==== Asia ====
- Baekje invades the outskirts of Silla in the Korean peninsula. The war continues until the peace treaty of 105.

=== By place ===
==== Roman Empire ====
- Emperor Domitian introduces the Capitoline Games.
- Roman general (and future emperor) Trajan begins a campaign to crush an uprising in Germania.
- Germania is divided into two provinces, Germania Inferior and Germania Superior (approximate date).
- Martial publishes Books I and II of the Epigrams.

==== Dacia ====
- First Battle of Tapae: Roman legions face disaster in Dacia, when Roman general Cornelius Fuscus launches a powerful offensive that becomes a failure. Encircled in the valley of Timi, he dies along with his entire army. Rome must pay tribute to the Dacians in exchange for a vague recognition of Rome's importance.

==== Asia ====
- Ban Gu (Pan Kou) and his sister Ban Zhao (Pan Tchao) compose the History of China.

=== By place ===
==== Roman Empire ====
- The Roman Julius Maternus explores western Africa (approximate date).
- Lyon, a city in Gaul, has a population of over 100,000 citizens (approximate date).
- Sextus Julius Sparsus gains power in the Roman Senate (approximate date).

==== Europe ====
- Decebalus becomes king of Dacia.

=== By place ===
==== Roman Empire ====
- Two Egyptian obelisks are erected in Benevento in front of the Temple of Isis, in honour of Emperor Domitian.
- Quintilian retires from teaching and from pleading, to compose his great work on the training of the orator (Institutio Oratoria).
- The First Dacian War ends: Decebalus becomes a client king of Rome, he receives money, craftsmen and war machines to protect the borders (limes) of the Roman Empire.

==== Asia ====
- Emperor Han Zhangdi dies at age 31 after a 13-year reign in which Chinese military forces have become powerful enough to march against tribes who threaten their northern and western borders. Having used intrigue as well as armed might to achieve his ends, Zhangdi and his General Ban Chao have reestablished Chinese influence in Inner Asia, but court eunuchs have increased their power during the emperor's reign. Zhangdi is succeeded by his 9-year-old son Zhao, who will reign until 105 as emperor Han Hedi, but he will be a virtual pawn of Empress Dou (adoptive mother) and scheming courtiers who will effectively rule the Chinese Empire.
- Last year (4th) of yuanhe era and start of zhanghe era of the Chinese Eastern Han dynasty.

=== By topic ===
==== Religion ====
- Pope Clement I succeeds Pope Anacletus I as the fourth pope.

=== By place ===
==== Europe ====
- January 1 – Lucius Antonius Saturninus incites a revolt against Emperor Domitian (it is suppressed by January 24).
- Legio XIII Gemina is transferred to Dacia, to help in the war against King Decebalus.
- Aquincum (old Budapest, Óbuda) is founded (approximate date).

==== Asia ====
- First year of Yongyuan era of the Chinese Han dynasty.
- June – Battle of Ikh Bayan: The Han Chinese army under Dou Xian, allied with the southern Xiongnu, is victorious over the Northern Xiongnu.

=== By topic ===
==== Religion ====
- Polycarpus I, Greek bishop of Byzantium, dies after a 20-year reign and is succeeded by Plutarch.

== Significant people ==
- Titus Flavius Vespasianus, Roman Emperor (AD 79–81)
- Titus Flavius Domitianus, Roman Emperor (AD 81–96)

== Births ==
AD 80

- Aspasius, Greek philosopher and writer (approximate date)
- Aśvaghoṣa, Indian philosopher and poet (d. c. 150)
- Yin, Chinese empress of the Han Dynasty (d. 103)

AD 81

- Deng Sui, Chinese empress of the Han Dynasty (d. 121)

AD 82

- Wang Fu, Chinese historian and philosopher (d. 167)

AD 83

- Vibia Sabina, Roman empress (d. c. 136)

AD 85

- August 21 – Marcion of Sinope, Greek theologian and founder of Marcionism (d. 160)
- December 28 – Vibia Matidia (the Younger), Roman noblewoman (approximate date)

AD 86

- September 19 – Antoninus Pius, Roman emperor (d. 161)

AD 87

- Pothinus, bishop of Lyon (approximate date)
- Rupilia Faustina, Roman noblewoman (approximate date)

AD 89

- Sindae, Korean ruler of Goguryeo (d. 179)

== Deaths ==
AD 80

- Kujula Kadphises, Kushan prince (approximate date)
- Lucius Vipstanus Messalla, Roman politician
- Philip the Apostle, Christian apostle and martyr
- Talhae of Silla, Korean ruler of Silla
- Vologases II, king of the Parthian Empire
- Zhao Xi, Chinese politician (b. AD 4)

AD 81

- September 13 – Titus, Roman emperor (b. AD 39)
- Artabanus III, king of the Parthian Empire

AD 82

- Anianus, Patriarch of Alexandria

AD 83

- Marcus Pompeius Silvanus, Roman politician
- Pomponia Graecina, Roman noblewoman

AD 84

- Luke the Evangelist, Greek physician and martyr
- Titus Flavius Sabinus, Roman consul married Julia Flavia (executed)

AD 85

- Gaius Oppius Sabinus, Roman politician and governor
- Lucius Mindius, Roman politician and aristocrat
- Titus Atilius Rufus, Roman politician and governor

AD 86

- June 9 – Cornelius Fuscus, Roman general and praetorian prefect

AD 88

- Dou Gu, Chinese general of the Han dynasty
- Gaius Vettulenus Civica Cerealis, Roman politician
- Han Zhangdi, Chinese emperor of the Han dynasty (b. AD 57)

AD 89

- Lucius Antonius Saturninus, Roman politician and general
- Polycarpus I, Greek bishop of Byzantium
