= Domitian's Wars against the Chatti =

Part of the Roman-Germanic Wars (83–89 CE)

- Part of the Wars of Domitian and the Roman-Germanic Wars
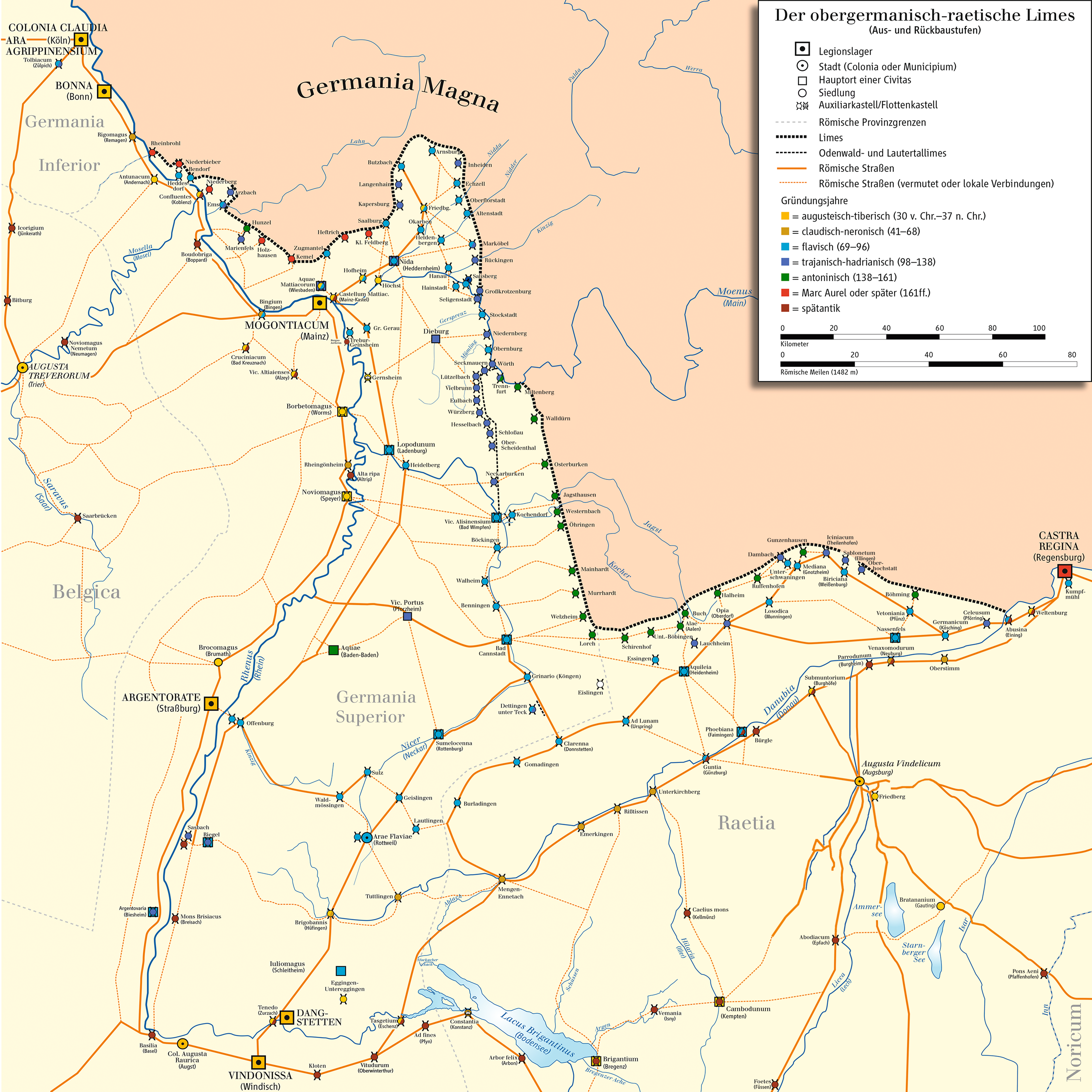
- Map of the Upper Germanic-Rhaetian Limes, theatre of military operations.
Date	AD 83–85, 88–89
Location	Along the Upper Germanic-Rhaetian Limes (modern-day Germany)
Result	Roman victory

Belligerents
Roman Empire; Cherusci; Hermunduri	Chatti; Roman renegades under Saturninus

Commanders and leaders
Domitian; Maecius Celer; Gaius Velius Rufus; Sextus Julius Frontinus; Catullus Messalinus; Aulus Didius Gallus; Fabricius Veiento; Vibius Crispus; Manius Acilius Glabrio; Chariomerus; Lappius Maximus	Antonius Saturnitus (executed); Gaius Civica Cerealis (executed); Sallustius Lucullus (executed)

Strength
40,000–55,000 soldiers in 10 legions	2 legions

Casualties and losses
1,650–1,800 killed	Unknown, probably heavy

Domitian's Wars against the Chatti were Roman military campaigns carried out between AD 83 and 89, against the German tribesmen of the Chatti, who later supporterd an army revolt by the Roman renegade Antonius Saturninus. Firstly, in 83, Roman Emperor Domitian and his 10 legions defeated the Chatti and pursued them, and even managed to capture some lands beyond the Upper Germanic-Rhaetian Limes. In the following years, many forts ("castra") were built along the Rhine, so that future invasions from the Chatti would remain in check. In January 89, Saturninus revolted with 2 legions, but this uprising was quickly put down.

The completion of the Upper Germanic-Rhaetian Limes would only arrive with the reign of Antoninus Pius, but Domitian's campaigns enstablished the foundation. The subjugation of the Chatti kept the Roman boundaries secure from Barbarian invasions for the next century, and until a period of crisis that is known as the Crisis of the Third Century.

== War against the Chatti, 83–85 ==
=== Composition of the Army ===
In 82/83, Domitian led the bulk of the army from Mogontiacum (modern-day Mainz) to campaign against the Germanic tribe of the Chatti, north of the Taunus Mountains. Domitian's force consisted of vexillationes (cavalry units) from 9 legions: I Adiutrix, II Adiutrix, II Augusta, VIII Augusta, IX Hispana, XI Claudia, XIV Gemina, XX Valeria Victrix and XXI Rapax, as well as the newly founded I Minervia.

Jones suggests the Roman army numbered 40,000 men, while Southern places its size at 50,000. Furthermore, during Domitian's reign, each legion included around 5,500 men. Therefore, a force of 10 legions would have numbered 55,000 men, not accounting for the possibility that the legions involved may not have been at full strength. The Roman army included around five alae and nine cohorts, for around 7,700–8,400 men. (Note: Spaul identifies 80 alae and 247 cohortes enlisted in the mid-second century, for a total of 327 auxiliary units, when the total amount of soldiers was roughly 180,800. Holder gives slightly different estimates (88 alae, 279 cohortes and 217,624 total soldiers in the army), but either way, each auxiliary unit (either an ala or a cohort) could have numbered between 550 and 600 soldiers.) Three of the auxiliary units are mentioned in inscriptions: Ala Gallorum Picentiana, Cohors I Germanorum and Cohors I Aquitanorum. Legio IX Hispania was commanded by Maecius Celer, while the other units were led by a centurion, Gaius Velius Rufus. Alongside the Emperor were Sextus Julius Frontinus, Catullus Messalinus, Aulus Didius Gallus, Fabricius Veiento, Vibius Crispus and Manius Acilius Glabrio. Veiento possibly held the rank of comes during the campaign. Domitian could have also obtained military alliances with neighbouring populations, such as the Cherusci (led by King Chariomerus) and the Hermunduri.

=== Campaign of 83 ===
Little is known for the campaign itself, as almost all the primary sources were lost. Frontinus records that, when the Chatti repeatedly fled into the forests and avoided the cavalry battle, Domitian ordered his horsemen to dismount and fight on foot once they reached their wagons. The Roman armies were thus able to penetrate and occupy Germanic territory for about 75 kilometres (47 mi) north-east of Mogontiacum, now including the allied people of the Mattiaci. Henderson hypothesizes that, since Domitian received four acclamations as Imperator by his soldiers between June 83 and September 84, the war ended with a peace treaty and the subjugation of the Chatti, and this would correspond to the last acclamation.

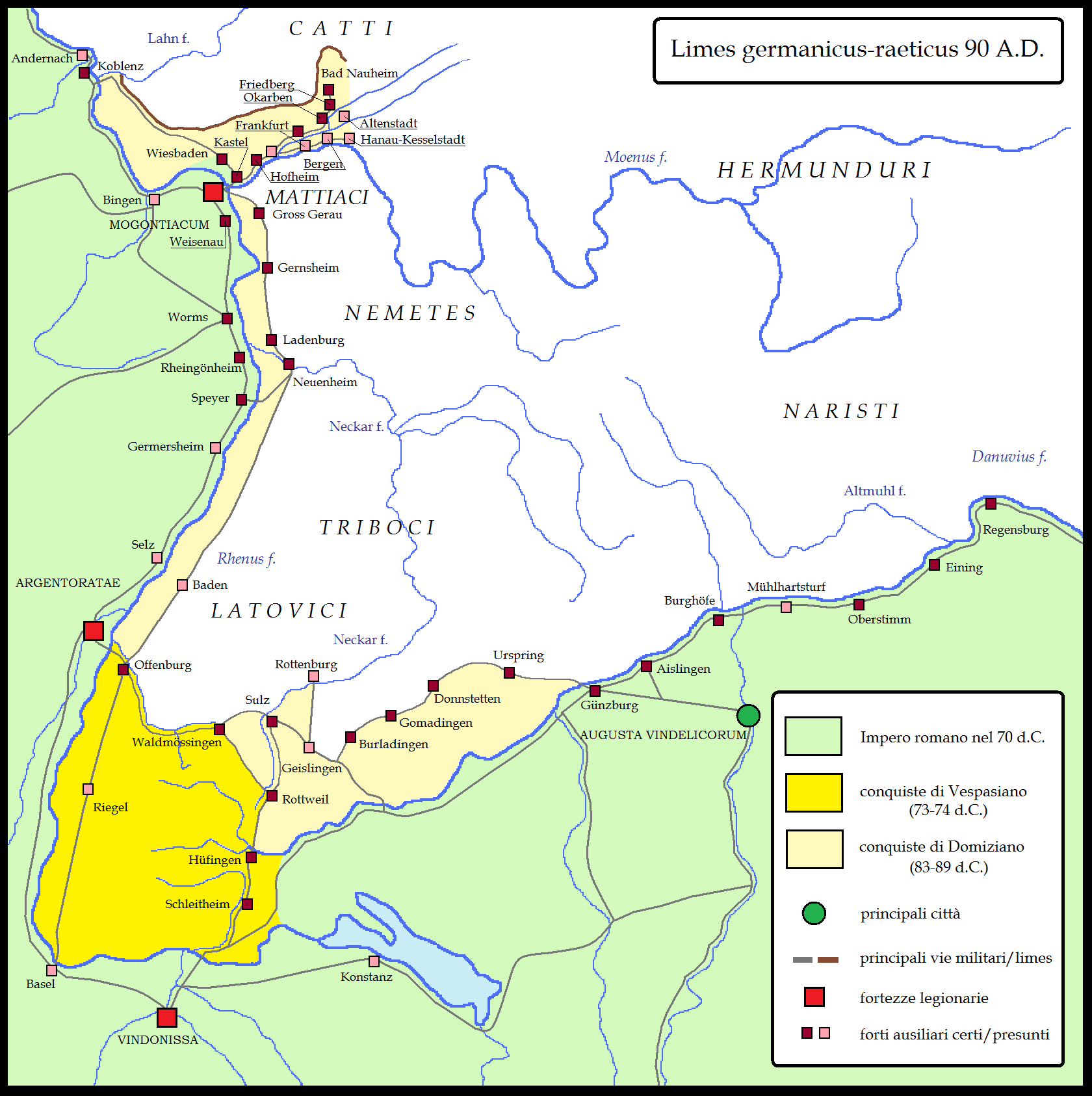
A map of Domitian's conquests in 83.

Frontinus's works place the starting date of the war in 82. Some historians accept this theory, whereas others state that it started in the first half of 83. Other historians, such as Southern, have reached a compromise: while preparations may have occurred starting in 82, the war actually took place in 83. Domitian received the title of Germanicus for his victories in 83. Jones, relying on coins and papyri, suggests that a triumph was awarded to the Emperor in between June 9 and August 28, whereas Southern states autumn of 83. Syme also suggests late 83, as the cognomen "Germanicus" appears on hardly any of the coins of 83, but upon most of 84. Some other sources place the triumph as far as in the beginning of 84.

The campaign ended with light losses on the Roman side, as only some veterans and three auxiliary units were lost, thus between 1,650 and 1,800 soldiers. Some ancient authors describe it as a "stale gibe", as there was no pitched battle against the Chatti. Henderson draws a connection between Domitian's and Caligula's campaigns. (Note: Caligula's campaigns, between AD 39 and 40, achieved no concrete results, however the Emperor claimed victory.) However, most modern historians consider the war an overall Roman success.

=== Campaigns of 84/85 ===
While almost all the sources agree on 85 as the ending year of the war, Syme argues the war had started and ended in 83. Southern agrees and states that the coins minted in 84 and early 85 are probably related to the creation of new provinces. Nevertheless, in the region between the Taunus Mountains and the Main, forts were established at Wiesbaden, Hofheim, Heddernheim, Okarben, and Friedberg. These forts were connected by newly built roads to facilitate legionary movements. In the event of an attack by the Chatti, their advance would be checked. Thus, Domitian created a new frontier on the eastern side of the Rhine. This territory had not originally belonged to the Chatti, but to the Mattiaci and Usipetes tribes, who were friendly toward the Roman Empire, the annexation provided protection against them. Furthermore, Frontinus claims that the Ubii received compensation in gold from Domitian when he erected forts in their territory. According to Henderson, this fort was Obernburg.

== Continuation of the War, 88–89 ==
=== Revolt against Chariomerus, 88 ===
In 88, the Chatti had expelled the King of the Cherusci, Chariomerus, who ruled in allieance with the Romans. When he asked Domitian for help, sending him hostages, he received money and not troops in return.

=== Saturninus' revolt, 89 ===
In AD 89, Antonius Saturninus, governor of Upper Germania, revolted with two legions and collaborated with the Chatti tribes. This threatened both Domitian's authority and the empire's security, as other military commitments stretched Roman forces thin. Domitian responded swiftly, mobilizing forces from across the empire. The decisive factor was the loyalty of Lappius Maximus, governor of Lower Germania, who defeated Saturninus despite being outnumbered. The Chatti attempted to support the revolt but were prevented from crossing the Rhine by a thaw. By the time reinforcements arrived, the rebellion had been crushed.

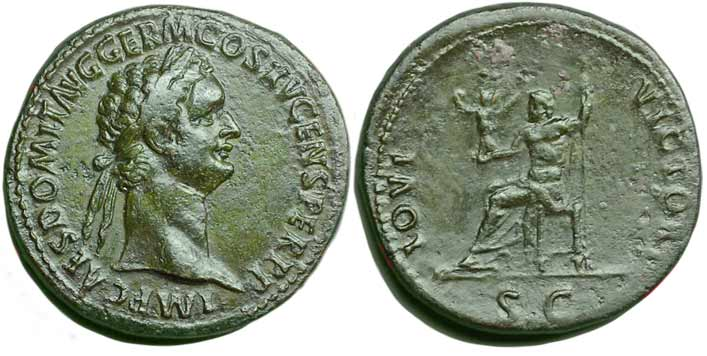
Sestertius of Domitian, minted after his Germanic campaigns.

Following the revolt's suppression, Lappius Maximus punished the Chatti, who had damaged Roman fortifications, and was tasked to execute Antonius Saturninus. Along with him, senator Gaius Civica Cerealis and the Governor of Britain, Sallustius Lucullus, were executed. Domitian's earlier strategic measures, the buffer zone beyond the Rhine, road networks, and division of Germania into two provinces, proved effective. The provincial structure enabled governors to check each other's power. Domitian rewarded loyal units, implemented new security measures including abolishing double legion camps, and relocated the treasonous Legio XXI Rapax to Pannonia.

While some scholars view the revolt as spontaneous, others suggest a broader conspiracy involving disaffected Roman elites. The revolt's timing, Domitian's rapid response, and subsequent executions of officials indicate possible senatorial involvement. The fact that soldiers had recently received pay increases and privileges suggested pressure came from above rather than below. These events likely convinced Domitian of the need to permanently resolve the Germanic threat.

== Bibliography ==
=== Books ===
- Evans, John Karl (1974). Senatorial History and the Principate of Domitian (PhD thesis). Hamilton, Ontario, Canada: McMaster University. hdl:11375/15810.
- Goldsworthy, Adrian K. (2000). Roman Warfare. Miami, Florida: Cassell History of Warfare. ISBN 978-0-304-36265-3.
- Syme, Ronald (1936) [1924]. "Flavian Wars and Frontiers". In Cook, S. A.; Charlesworth, M. P.; Adcock, F. E. (eds.). The Cambridge Ancient History. Vol. XI: The Imperial Peace, A.D. 70–192. Cambridge University Press. pp. 131–188.
- Henderson, Bernard W. (1969) [1927]. Five Roman emperors: Vespasian, Titus, Domitian, Nerva, Trajan, AD 69–117. New York: Barnes & Noble. OCLC 1149034702.
- Jones, Brian W. (1992). The Emperor Domitian. London and New York: Routledge. ISBN 978-0-415-10195-0.
- Scarre, Chris (1995). Chronicle of Roman Emperors. London: Thames & Hudson. ISBN 978-0-500-05077-4.
- Southern, Pat (1997). Domitian: Tragic Tyrant. London and New York: Routledge. ISBN 978-1-134-85312-0.
- Spaul, John E. H. (1994). Ala²: The Auxiliary Cavalry Units of the Pre-Diocletian Imperial Roman Army. Archeopress. OCLC 492878184.
- ——— (2000). Cohors²: The Evidence for and a Short History of the Auxiliary Infantry units of the Imperial Roman Army. Nectoreca Press. OCLC 45008692.

=== Research papers ===
- Evans, John Karl (1975). "The Dating of Domitian's War against the Chatti Again". Historia: Zeitschrift für Alte Geschichte. 24 (1). Stuttgart, Germany: Franz Steiner Verlag: 121–124. JSTOR 4435431.
- Holder, Paul (2003). "Auxiliary Deployment in the Reign of Hadrian". Bulletin of the Institute of Classical Studies. 81. Oxford University Press: 101–145. JSTOR 43768069.
- Jones, Brian W. (1973). "The Dating of Domitian's War against the Chatti". Historia: Zeitschrift für Alte Geschichte. 22 (1). Stuttgart, Germany: Franz Steiner Verlag: 79–90. JSTOR 4435316.
- ——— (1982). "Domitian's Advance into Germany and Moesia". Latomus. 41 (2). Société d'Études Latines de Bruxelles: 329–335. JSTOR 41532496.
- Kennedy, David (1983). "C. Velius Rufus". Britannia. 18. Cambridge: Society for the Promotion of Roman Studies: 183–196. doi:10.2307/526348. JSTOR 526348.
- Malloch, S. J. V. (2015). "Frontinus and Domitian: the politics of the Strategemata". Chiron. 45. Berlin, Germany: Walter de Gruyter: 77–100. doi:10.34780/sdl2-csi4.
- McDermott, William C. (1970). "Fabricius Veiento". American Journal of Philology. 91 (2). Baltimore, Maryland: Johns Hopkins University Press: 129–148. doi:10.2307/293038. JSTOR 293038.
- Syme, Ronald (1978). "Antonius Saturninus". Journal of Roman Studies. 68. Cambridge: Society for the Promotion of Roman Studies: 12–21. doi:10.2307/299623. JSTOR 299623.
- Turner, Andrew (2007). "Frontinus and Domitian: Laus Principis in the "Strategemata"". Harvard Studies in Classical Philology. 103. Department of the Classics, Harvard University: 423–449. JSTOR 30032230.
