= Dema =

Dema or DEMA may refer to:

== Acronyms ==
- Association for Democracy Assistance and Human Rights, a Czech organization
- Danish Emergency Management Agency (Danish: Beredskabsstyrelsen), a Danish governmental agency under the Ministry of Defence
- Detroit Electronic Music Archive
- Malaysia Youth and Students Democratic Movement
- Differential Electromagnetic Analysis, a method for obtaining information from computer chips
- N,N-Diethylmethylamine, a tertiary amine
- Double Exponential Smoothing (D-EMA), a variation of exponential smoothing

== People ==
- Ademar Fonseca (commonly known as Dema, 1963–2017), Brazilian football manager
- Dema (footballer) (born 1983), William de Mattia, Brazilian football midfielder
- Dema Harshbarger (1884–1964), American concert promoter and talent manager
- Dema Kovalenko (born 1977), Ukrainian-American footballer
- Dorji Dema (born 1983), athlete from Bhutan who competes in archery
- Gjergji Dëma (born 1971), Albanian footballer
- Marjan Dema (born 1957), Professor of Mathematics and Rector of the University of Pristina
- Tjawangwa Dema (born 1981), Motswana poet

== Places ==
- Dema, Kentucky, United States
- N'Déma, a town and sub-prefecture in the Faranah Region of Guinea
- Déma, Benin

== Other uses ==
- Dema Deity, an anthropological classification of foundational culture deities
- Dema language, a Bantu language of Mozambique
- Dema, a fictional location in the lore of Twenty One Pilots

== See also ==
- Demas, an associate of the Apostle Paul in the New Testament
- Demas Range, Marie Byrd Land, Antarctica
