= Arkhip =

Arkhip (Russian: Архип), also transliterated as Archip, Arkhyp, or Arhip, is an East Slavic masculine given name derived from the Greek name Ἄρχιππος Archippos/Archippus ("master of horses"). Patronymic surnames derived from the name include Arkhipov, Arkhypchuk, Arkhypenko, and Arkhipienka.

Notable people with the name include:

- Arkhip Bogolyubov (1854–1887), Russian revolutionary
- Arkhip Kuindzhi (1842–1910), Russian-born landscape painter of Greek descent
- Arkhyp Lyulka (1908–1984), Soviet scientist and designer of jet engines of Ukrainian origin
- Arkhip Ruchkin (1898–1979), Soviet Army lieutenant general

== See also ==
- ARCHIP, an acronym for the Architectural Institute in Prague
- Archips, genus of moths
- Arhip, Romanian surname
