= 110s =

Decade

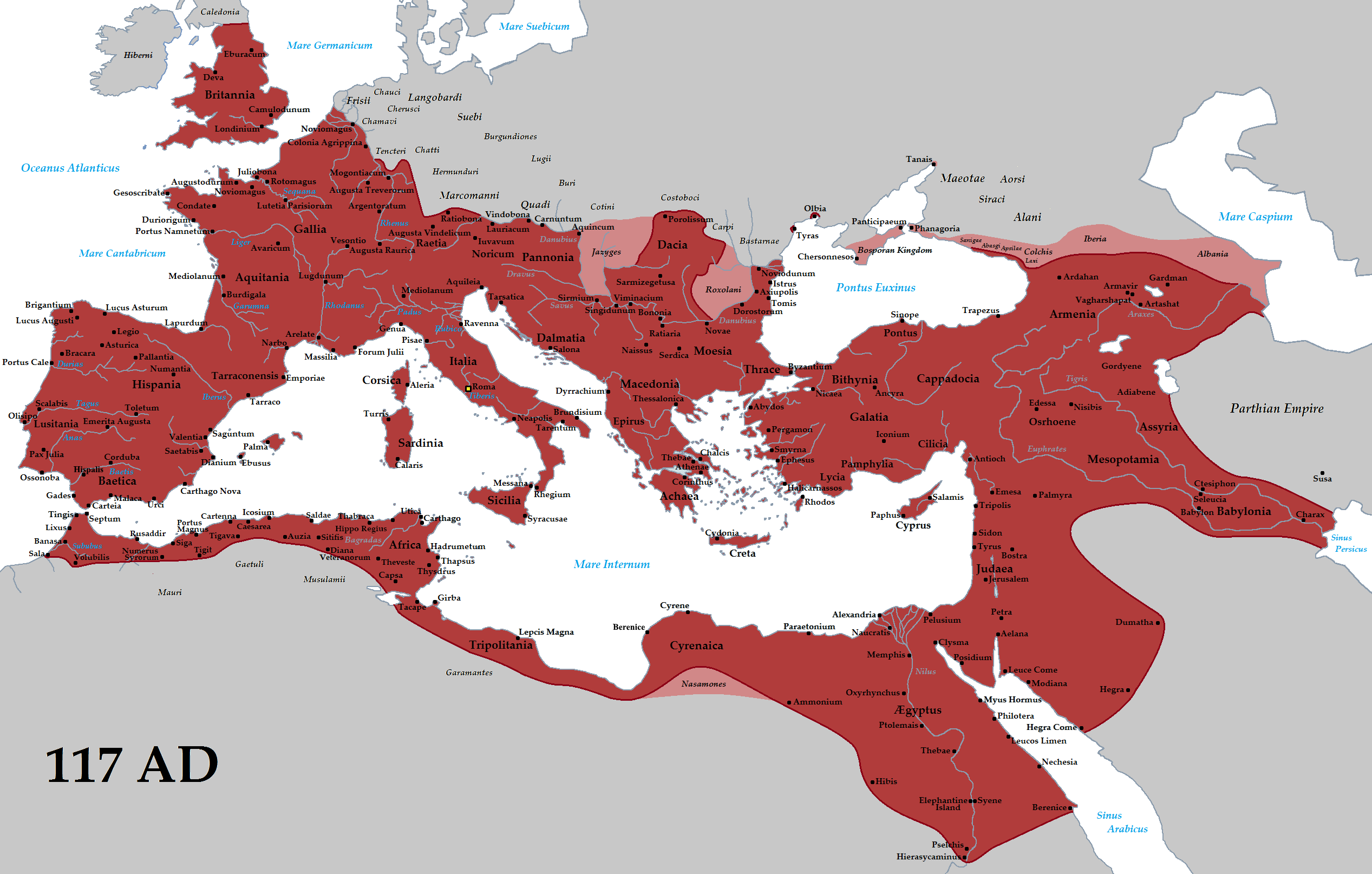
Roman Empire in AD 117, at its greatest extent Vassals of Rome

The 110s was a decade that ran from January 1, AD 110, to December 31, AD 119.

In 114, the Roman Empire, ruled by Trajan, invaded Armenia; annexed it as a Roman province and killed Parthamasiris, who had been placed on the Armenian throne by his relative, the Parthia King Osroes I. In 115, the Roman Army overran northern Mesopotamia, commencing Trajan's Parthian campaign. The war was initially successful for the Romans, who, as a result, attained their greatest territorial extent. However, a series of setbacks, including wide-scale Jewish uprisings in the Eastern Mediterranean and North Africa and Trajan's death in 117, led to a Roman withdrawal. Trajan was succeeded by Hadrian, who withdrew from Mesopotamia and suppressed the last remnants of the Jewish revolt. Near the end of the decade, a rebellion in Roman Britain was suppressed. In 118, the Chinese Eastern Han dynasty suppressed a revolt by Qiang tribes which had erupted the prior decade.

An earthquake occurred in Antioch in 115, killing an estimated 260,000 people. The cities of Antioch, Daphne and Apamea were almost completely destroyed. Trees were uprooted and felled; people were thrown down to the ground. It had an estimated magnitude of 7.5 on the surface wave magnitude scale and an estimated maximum intensity of XI (Extreme) on the Mercalli intensity scale. Antioch and surrounding areas were devastated with a great loss of life and property. It triggered a local tsunami that badly damaged the harbour at Caesarea Maritima. The Roman Emperor Trajan was caught in the earthquake, as was his successor Hadrian. Although the consul Marcus Pedo Vergilianus was killed, they escaped with only slight injuries and later began a program to rebuild the city.

In architecture, the decade saw the construction of Trajan's Forum (the last of the Imperial fora to be constructed in ancient Rome), Trajan's Column (which commemorates the Roman victory in the Dacian Wars), the Arch of Trajan, and the Roman Pantheon. Around this time, Juvenal wrote Satires, a collection of satirical poems.

== Events ==
=== 110 ===
==== By place ====
====== Roman Empire ======
- The Forum of Trajan is constructed in Rome, by the Syrian architect Apollodorus of Damascus.
- The Roman Empire has more than 75,000 kilometers (47,000 mi) of roads.

====== Asia ======
- Caravans make regular departures from Luoyang with Chinese ginger, cassia (a type of cinnamon), and silk to be bartered in Central Asia for gold, silver, glassware, pottery, cloth, and intaglio gems from Rome.

==== By topic ====
====== Art and science ======
- Suetonius, Roman historian, publishes Viris Illustribus ("On Famous Men" – in the field of literature).

=== 111 ===
==== By place ====
====== Roman Empire ======
- Emperor Trajan sends Pliny the Younger to be governor (legatus Augusti) of Bithynia.

=== 112 ===
==== By place ====
====== Roman Empire ======
- Emperor Trajan and Titus Sextius Cornelius Africanus become Roman consuls.
- August 29 – Salonia Matidia receives the title of Augusta upon the death of Marciana.
- Hadrian succeeds Gaius Julius Cassius Steirieus as archon of Athens.
- Tacitus is named proconsul of the Roman province of Asia (112–113).

====== Asia ======
- King Jima succeeds Pasa as ruler of the Korean kingdom of Silla.

=== 113 ===
==== By place ====
====== Roman Empire ======
- Trajan's Column near the Colosseum in Rome is completed to commemorate the Emperor's victory over the Dacians in the Second Dacian War.
- Osroes I of Parthia violates the treaty with Rome by installing a puppet ruler in Armenia. Emperor Trajan marches east, without first attempting to use diplomacy to resolve the disagreement.
- Emperor Trajan sails from Rome to begin his expedition against Parthia. He arrives in Athens where Parthian envoys greet him with olive branches, a sign of peace.
- Basilica Ulpia is dedicated.

====== Asia ======
- Last (7th) year of Yongchu era of the Chinese Eastern Han Dynasty.
- "Pattini dheivam" worship is inaugurated in Kannagi Temple in the Chera Kingdom in India, by Emperor Cenkuttuvan; the function is attended by GajaBahu, king of Central Sri Lanka (Mahavamso).

=== 114 ===
==== By place ====
====== Roman Empire ======
- Construction begins on the Arch of Trajan in Benevento.
- The kingdom of Osroene becomes a vassal kingdom of the Roman Empire.
- Emperor Trajan defeats the Parthians and overruns Armenia and northern Mesopotamia.
- A monument to Philopappos, prince-in-exile of old Commagene (a buffer-state between Rome and Parthia) is erected in Athens.

====== Asia ======
- First year of Yuanchu era of the Chinese Eastern Han dynasty.

==== By topic ====
====== Religion ======
- Change of Patriarch of Constantinople from Patriarch Sedecion to Patriarch Diogenes.

=== 115 ===
==== By place ====
====== Roman Empire ======
- Emperor Trajan is cut off in southern Mesopotamia after his invasion of that region.
- Trajan captures the Parthian capital of Ctesiphon.
- The Diaspora Revolt erupts almost simultaneously across various Jewish Diaspora communities in the empire's east, including Egypt, Libya and Cyprus.
- Alexandria in Egypt is damaged during the Jewish-Greek civil wars. Marcus Rutilius Lupus, the Roman governor, sends Legio XXII Deiotariana to protect the inhabitants of Memphis.
- A revolt breaks out in Britain; the garrison at Eboracum (York) is massacred.
- The Pantheon of Agrippa is reconstructed in Rome.

====== Asia ======
- An earthquake destroys Apamea and Antioch in Syria. The local bishop is held responsible (he will be martyred and remembered as St. Ignatius).

==== By topic ====
====== Religion ======
- Pope Sixtus I succeeds Alexander I as the seventh pope of Rome (according to Catholic biographies).

=== 116 ===
==== By place ====
====== Roman Empire ======
- Emperor Trajan completes his invasion of Parthia by capturing the cities of Seleucia, Babylon, Ctesiphon and Susa, marking the high-water mark of the Roman Empire's eastern expansion.
- Trajan makes Syria a province of Rome and crosses the Tigris to annex Adiabene. He proceeds with his army to the Persian Gulf and conquers territory that becomes the province of Parthia.
- Trajan removes Osroes I as king of Parthia, and appoints his son Parthamaspates in his place. Parthamaspates romanizes his name to Parthicus.
- Trajan sends two expeditionary forces. One, consisting of elements of Legio III Cyrenaica, to suppress the revolt in Judea and the other Legio VII Claudia to restore order on Cyprus.
- In summer, rebellious movement emerges in Mesopotamia against Roman occupation. General Lusius Quietus is sent by Trajan to suppress the uprisings, recovering Nisibis, besieging and sacking Edessa, and waging war against local Jews
- Trajan sends laureatae to the Roman Senate on account of his victories and being conqueror of Parthia.
- Quintus Marcius Turbo sails to Alexandria and defeats Jewish insurgents in several pitched battles.

=== 117 ===
==== By place ====
====== Roman Empire ======
- Trajan falls seriously ill, leaving Hadrian in command of the east. On his death bed, Trajan allegedly adopts Hadrian and designates him as his successor.
- August 9 - 11 – Emperor Trajan dies of a stroke at Selinus in Cilicia, age 63, while en route from Mesopotamia to Italy, leaving the Roman Empire at its maximal territorial extent.
- Hadrian, who will reign until 138, succeeds him.
  - Hadrian, a Spaniard like Trajan, as Emperor inaugurates a policy of retrenchment and cultural integration, giving up the policy of conquest of his predecessor in order to consolidate the empire.
- The Jewish Diaspora Revolt is quelled, likely by autumn 117, though unrest may have persisted in Egypt until early 118. Its suppression results in the near-complete expulsion of Jews from Cyrenaica, Cyprus, and several regions of Egypt.
- Hadrian returns large parts of Mesopotamia to the Parthians, as part of a peace settlement.
- Construction begins on the Pantheon in Rome.
- The Roman Empire reaches its greatest extent.

==== By topic ====
====== Commerce ======
- The silver content of the Roman denarius falls to 87 percent under emperor Hadrian, down from 93 percent in the reign of Trajan.

====== Religion ======
- John I becomes the 7th Bishop of Jerusalem.

=== 118 ===
==== By place ====
====== Roman Empire ======
- Trajan's Forum (commissioned by the late Emperor Trajan) is completed with triumphal arches, columns, a market complex, and an enormous basilica, all of which replace hundreds of dwellings.
- Emperor Hadrian is also a Roman Consul.
- Rome has a population exceeding 1 million, making it the largest city in the world.
- Osroene is returned to native rule by the Roman Empire.
- Plot of the consuls: Hadrian executes four senators, all former consuls, who had been shown to have plotted against him. His relations with the Senate are strained.
- Pantheon, in Rome, starts to be built (approximate date).
- 118–128 – Battle of Centaurs and Wild Beasts, from Hadrian's Villa, Tivoli, Italy, is made (approximate date). It may be a copy of a painting done by the late 5th century BC Greek artist Zeuxis. It is now kept at Staatliche Museen zu Berlin, Preussischer Kulturbesitz, Antikensammlung.

====== Asia ======
- The north-south feud between the Hun Dynasty ends.
- The oldest known painted depiction of a wheelbarrow is found in a Chinese tomb of Chengde, Sichuan province, dated to this year.

=== 119 ===
==== By place ====
====== Roman Empire ======
- Emperor Hadrian stations Legio VI Victrix in Roman Britain, to assist in quelling the resistance of a local rebellion. The legion is key in securing the victory, and eventually replaces Legio IX Hispana at Eboracum.
- Hadrian also visits Britain in this year at the request of governor of Britain Quintus Pompeius Falco.
- Salonia Matidia (a niece of former Emperor Trajan) dies. Hadrian delivers her funeral oration, and grants her a temple in Rome.

====== Asia ======
- Reign in Northern India by Nahapana, Scythian king. He attacks the kingdom of Andhra and annexes Southern Rajputana.

== Significant people ==
- Trajan, Roman Emperor

== Births ==
110

- Hegesippus of Nazarene, Christian chronicler and writer (d. 180)
- Qiao Xuan (or Gongzu), Chinese official and chancellor (d. 184)

111

- Antinous, Bithynian Greek lover of Emperor Hadrian (d. 130)

113

- Adrianus, Greek sophist philosopher (d. 193)
- Gnaeus Claudius Severus Arabianus, Roman senator and philosopher (d. after 176)

115

- Pausanias, Greek historian and geographer (d. 180)
- Shun of Han, Chinese emperor of the Han Dynasty (d. 144)

116

- Liang Na, wife of Shun of Han (d. 150)

117

- Aelius Aristides, Greek orator (d. 181)

119

- Gaius Bruttius Praesens, Roman politician (approximate date)
- Marina of Aguas Santas, Roman Christian martyr (d. 139)

== Deaths ==
110

- Duan Xi, Chinese Protector General of the Western Regions
- Pacorus II, ruler (King of Kings ) of the Parthian Empire

112

- Beatus of Lungern, Swiss monk and hermit
- Pasa (the Great), Korean ruler of Silla

113

- Pliny the Younger, Roman lawyer and scientist (b. AD 61)

115

- Alexander I, bishop of Rome (approximate date)
- Dio Chrysostom, Greek philosopher and historian (b. AD 40)

116

- March 30 – Quirinus of Neuss, Roman Christian martyr according to Roman Catholic tradition
- Abgar VII, ruler of Osroene (approximate date)
- Ban Zhao, female Chinese historian (b. AD 49)
- Philopappos, prince of Commagene (b. AD 65)
- Zacchaeus of Jerusalem, bishop of Jerusalem

117

- August 8 – Trajan, Roman emperor (b. AD 53)
- Gaius Cornelius Tacitus, Roman historian (b. AD 56)
- Gaius Julius Quadratus Bassus, Roman general in Judea (b. AD 70)
- Hermione of Ephesus, Maurus, Pantalemon and Sergius, Astius and several other Christian martyrs in persecution by Trajan

118

- August 8 – Primus, patriarch of Alexandria
- Aulus Cornelius Palma, Roman politician
- Bassus of Lucera, Roman bishop and martyr
- Gaius Avidius Nigrinus, Roman politician
- Lucius Publilius Celsus, Roman politician
- Lusius Quietus, Roman general and governor
- Ren Shang, Chinese general of Han Dynasty
- Terentian, Roman bishop and martyr

119

- December 23 – Salonia Matidia, niece of Trajan (b. AD 68)
- Plutarch, Greek historian and biographer (b. AD 46)
- San Secondo of Asti, Roman bishop and martyr
- Serapia, Roman slave and martyr (approximate date)
