= Agora (organization) =

Russian human rights group

Interregional Association of Human Rights Organizations "Agora"
- Founded: 28 April 2005
- Founder: Pavel Chikov
- Type: Non-profit
- Purpose: Human rights
- Location: Kazan, Russia
- Origins: Kazan Human Rights Center, Chita Human Rights Center, Chuvashia Human Rights Organization "Shield and Sword"
- Region served: Russia
- Services: Legal advocacy
- Key people: Pavel Chikov, Irina Khrunova, Ramil Akhmetgaliev
- Employees: About 30 lawyers
- Website: openinform.ru

Agora (in full, Inter-regional Association of Human Rights Organizations "Agora", Russian: Межрегиональная Ассоциация правозащитных организаций "АГОРА") is a Russian human rights group based in Kazan, Tatarstan. It provides legal advocacy for victims of suspected human rights abuses by government officials such as police, military and prison officers, with a particular focus on journalists, political activists, bloggers and Non-Governmental Organizations (NGOs). The organization was awarded the Rafto Prize for its work on 25 September 2014.

== History ==
Agora was established in Kazan on 28 April 2005 by a group of lawyers who specialize in high-profile cases of alleged abuse of state power. The organization was a union of a number of groups, including the Kazan Human Rights Center, the Chita Human Rights Center and the Chuvashia human rights organization "Shield and Sword". The organization was registered on 12 September 2005.

It is a member of the Association for Democracy Assistance and Human Rights.

== Key personnel ==
- Chair – Pavel Chikov, Associate Professor of Law
- Vice Chair – Guzel Davletshina
- Legal Analyst – Irina Khrunova
- Legal Analyst – Ramil Akhmetgaliyev
- Head of Information – Dmitry Kolbasin

== Activities ==
Their main area of work is the defence of Russian citizens from unlawful actions by state officials. Their clients include political activists, journalists, bloggers, and non-governmental organizations.

=== Current cases ===
Agora's current cases include:

- Oleg Kashin, journalist of Kommersant, beaten by suspected Putinist assailants
- Yevgeny Shipilov, journalist of Gazeta.ru, beaten by police
- Voina, a radical art group
- Marat Gelman, art gallery owner
- Artemy Troitsky rock music journalist, accused of insulting police
- Artyom Loskutov, artist, accused of insulting police

=== Successful defences ===
Their successful defences include:

- Lyudmila Kuzmina, head of the Samara branch of GOLOS election monitoring organization, harassed by authorities and prosecuted for unlicensed computer software
- Lyudmila Kotova, editor of Samara newspaper VolgaInform
- Vera Dementieva, director of the Tambov Center for the Physical, Legal and Spiritual Development of Children and Adolescents
- Nina Maksimova, head of the Mari El organization Mari Ushem
- Mikhail Afanasyev, editor of the internet magazine New Focus
- Natalya Petrova, Kazan journalist and her parents
- Andrei Kutuzov and Rustam Fakhretdinov, Tyumen Anarchists
- Andrei Petrov, Izhevsk anti-fascist activist
- Vitaly Cherkasov, head of the Trans-Baikal Human Rights Center
- Dmitry Solovyov, blogger
- Sergey Kurt-Adzhiyev, editor of Novaya Gazeta in Samara
- Vladimir Pribylovsky, author of the website anticomprommat.ru
- Anastasia Denisova, head of the Krasnodar human rights organization "ETNIKA"
- Lidiya Rybina, head of the Tambov Human Rights Center
- Tatsiana Rutkevich, chief accountant of the commissioner for human rights in Tatarstan
- Aleksei Gaskarov, anti-fascist journalist from the Institute of Collective Action, for attacks on the Khimki administration
- Vladimir Yefimov, editor of Vechernyaya Tyumen
- Maksim Yefimov; Agora successfully challenged the court-ordered committal to a psychiatric hospital for a blog post critical of the Russian Orthodox Church; in October 2012 granted political asylum in Estonia
- Yekaterina Samutsevich of Pussy Riot; Agora achieved a high-profile success on 10 October 2012 when Irina Khrunova secured Samutsevich's release on probation.

=== Groups represented ===
- Union of the Committees of Soldiers' Mothers of Russia
- Independent Psychiatric Association of Russia
- Moscow Research Center for Human Rights
- GOLOS, an organization which defends voters' rights and monitors elections
- Novorossiysk Committee of Human Rights
- Movement for Nuclear Safety
- Planet of Hopes, a Chelyabinsk human rights organization

=== Successful prosecutions ===
- attackers of Vadim Karastelyov in Novorossiysk
- attackers of Alexei Suslikov in Saratov
- Denis Fedorov, a Cheboksary human rights activist; police search found to be illegal
- Rustem Valiullin, an Izhevsk lawyer; compensation for moral damages following illegal police search
- Nasimi Nazarov, an army officer, convicted of selling a soldier into slavery in one of the first cases of its kind in Russia
- 10 students from the elite Novosibirsk Higher Military Command School (NVVKU), convicted in connection to the death of 17-year-old student Radmir Sagitov. Head of NVVKU dismissed, family of deceased paid 3.5 million rubles compensation
- Vladimir Zhidkov, head of the Federal Penitentiary Service in Chelyabinsk and 17 subordinates; convicted in connection with the murder of prisoners in Kopeysk colony No. 1

=== Official reactions ===
AGORA, in conjunction with the Ministry of Economic Development (Russia) and the Higher School of Economics is working on legislative initiatives to improve the situation of Russian NGOs. They also participate in hearings of the Civic Chamber of the Russian Federation and prepare manuals for Rospotrebnadzor.

On 4 June 2009 the Ministry of Justice included AGORA on the list of independent legal experts mandated to oversee the drafting of anti-corruption legislation.

Vladimir Lukin, the Russian Commissioner for Human Rights, also referred to as the Ombudsman, has spoken positively about Agora's work on more than one occasion. In the 2011 report of the Commissioner for Human Rights, he wrote:

"In January 2012, the Interregional Association of Human Rights Organizations 'Agora', which is unnoticed in apologetics of government officials, published a review of, in its view, good judicial decisions during the reporting year. The human rights activists concluded that our courts have, in fact, shown a willingness to fundamentally assess hate crimes committed on nationalistic grounds, are gradually learning to distinguish between neo-Nazis and anti-fascists, and are refusing to recognize the highly questionable claims of law enforcement and government officials to be treated as 'social groups'."

Lukin also referred to Agora's work during a meeting with Russian President Dmitry Medvedev on 28 February 2012:

Medvedev: If they are filing fewer complaints, it is the first sign that the situation is more or less normal.

Lukin: This is the first sign that the situation is getting better. Granted, I am not the best messenger, because I work with complaints rather than complements, so I pay less attention to that aspect. But there is a whole set of positive factors. For example, AGORA organisation [Interregional Association of Human Rights Organisations] which may not be suspected of any warm attitudes toward the authorities, notes some very positive changes in certain court cases. On the one hand, people file complaints about judges and continue to complain, but on the other hand, there are elements that garner respect. For example, the courts have begun to take more adequate measures when dealing with aggressive nationalists, Nazis and some other destructive social elements.

=== Opinions on Agora ===
Chief Editor of Novaya Gazeta Dmitry Muratov in the program Minority Report on Echo of Moscow, 20 July 2009:

"I can tell you that 'Agora' and the Kazan Human Rights Center are committed to protecting Russian citizens from abuses by law enforcement. They were involved in cases of torture by the police, they're working on developing ways people can protect themselves from injustices on the part of the authorities. According to the Kazan Human Rights Center, several criminal cases was brought against the police officers who abused people. 'Agora' is currently representing, in part, the interests of the victims of Major (Denis) Yevsyukov, who, as you know, shot 9 people."

=== Publications ===
In 2008, Agora and the Resource Advocacy Center presented the book NGOs: a decade of survival. It contains an analysis of existing law and judicial practice concerning the registration and control of NGOs. The study is based on more than 250 cases of judicial decisions on the liquidation and termination of the activities of NGOs.

In 2010 Agora and Novaya Gazeta published the book "Militsiya of disintegration era".

In 2012, they published the book "Methods of Conducting Public Events".

=== Research ===
In 2011 Agora reported 850 cases of harassment of activists, journalists and NGOs from 60 regions of the country. In 2010 they reported 603 cases from 50 regions; in 2009, 308 cases; in 2008, 144 cases; in 2007, 212 cases; in 2006, 118 cases.

In 2011, reporting on actions against bloggers and journalists, they noted 11 attacks, 173 cases of administrative pressure, 38 prosecutions and 231 cases of restrictions on access to websites. They also noted 31 cyber-attacks, 11 civil penalties against bloggers and 5 proposals on regulation of the Internet from politicians and officials.

== Criticism ==
According to an article published on 20 December 2011 by Arina Morokova of the New Region news agency, Agora receives funding from U.S. based agencies hostile to Russia, including the National Endowment for Democracy, the MacArthur Foundation, and the George Soros funded Open Society Foundations. The article also alleges that Agora, through its activities in support of HIV-positive Russians, lobbied for the introduction of methadone replacement therapy, which is currently illegal and widely opposed in Russia. In addition, "Agora" was accused of law violations allegedly identified by the Office of Tax Crimes of the Tatarstan Interior Ministry, in particular:

- failure to pay tax on income from donations
- participating in the laundering of the proceeds of crime and financing terrorism
- buying property in central Kazan by unknown means

Agora responded to the allegations on the same day saying:

- In July 2011, all claims of the tax service were rejected by the High Court of Arbitration of Russia.
- A 2009 investigation by Novaya Gazeta found no evidence of financial fraud or financing of terrorism.
- The Agora Association owns no property, and the building where the Agora lawyers work belongs to the Kazan Human Rights Center, which in 2008 was awarded a grant by the prestigious McArthur Foundation specifically for its purchase.
- Agora does not lobby for methadone replacement therapy.

In December 2011, officials from the Federal Drug Control Service of Russia (FSKN) in Moscow, in conjunction with State Duma representative Igor Arkhipov found Agora to be in compliance with existing drug control legislation. In response to a query by police Lieutenant General V. K. Davydov, FSKN head Vladimir Rosinski said "Our investigation shows that the Inter-regional Association of Human Rights Organizations "Agora" does not engage in propaganda in support of drug legalization and the introduction of replacement therapy (methadone)".

Meanwhile, the editor in chief of the New Region news agency Yuliya Shatova apologized the next day, saying:

"I offer you my apologies for yesterday's publication. We are currently engaged in formal processes with the journalist who wrote this material. Once again please excuse any false statements. Obviously, there has been a breach of trust.

Subsequently New Day published a rebuttal to Arina Morokova's article.

== Targeting ==
Agora was one of the first organizations in Russia to be classified as a "foreign agent" based on the Russian foreign agent law, on the grounds that it conducts political activity and receives foreign funding. As a response, Agora canceled its sources of foreign money and appealed to be removed from the list, without success.

On 10 February 2016, the Tatarstan Supreme Court formally ordered the liquidation of Agora. It acted on a finding by Russia's Justice Ministry that Agora had engaged in "political activity," since it was attempting to "influence public opinion" through its work.

International Agora began its activities in 2015 – six months before the liquidation of the Association of the same name. On 19 June 2023, the Prosecutor General's Office of the Russian Federation designated the international human rights group "Agora" as undesirable.
