= AD 114 =

114 in various calendars
- Gregorian calendar: 114; CXIV
- Ab urbe condita: 867
- Assyrian calendar: 4864
- Balinese saka calendar: 35–36
- Bengali calendar: −480 – −479
- Berber calendar: 1064
- Buddhist calendar: 658
- Burmese calendar: −524
- Byzantine calendar: 5622–5623
- Chinese calendar: 癸丑年 (Water Ox); 2811 or 2604 — to — 甲寅年 (Wood Tiger); 2812 or 2605
- Coptic calendar: −170 – −169
- Discordian calendar: 1280
- Ethiopian calendar: 106–107
- Hebrew calendar: 3874–3875
- Hindu calendars
- Vikram Samvat: 170–171
- Shaka Samvat: 35–36
- Kali Yuga: 3214–3215
- Holocene calendar: 10114
- Iranian calendar: 508 BP – 507 BP
- Islamic calendar: 524 BH – 523 BH
- Javanese calendar: N/A
- Julian calendar: 114; CXIV
- Korean calendar: 2447
- Minguo calendar: 1798 before ROC 民前1798年
- Nanakshahi calendar: −1354
- Seleucid era: 425/426 AG
- Thai solar calendar: 656–657
- Tibetan calendar: ཆུ་མོ་གླང་ལོ་ (female Water-Ox); 240 or −141 or −913 — to — ཤིང་ཕོ་སྟག་ལོ་ (male Wood-Tiger); 241 or −140 or −912

Year 114 (CXIV) was a common year starting on Sunday of the Julian calendar. At the time, it was known as the Year of the Consulship of Hasta and Vopiscus (or, less frequently, year 867 Ab urbe condita). The denomination 114 for this year has been used since the early medieval period, when the Anno Domini calendar era became the prevalent method in Europe for naming years.

== Events ==
=== By place ===
==== Roman Empire ====
- Construction begins on the Arch of Trajan in Benevento.
- The kingdom of Osroene becomes a vassal kingdom of the Roman Empire.
- Emperor Trajan defeats the Parthians and overruns Armenia and northern Mesopotamia.
- A monument to Philopappos, prince-in-exile of old Commagene (a buffer-state between Rome and Parthia) is erected in Athens.

==== Asia ====
- First year of Yuanchu era of the Chinese Eastern Han dynasty.

=== By topic ===
==== Religion ====
- Change of Patriarch of Constantinople from Patriarch Sedecion to Patriarch Diogenes.
