= Arkhypenko =

Arkhypenko (Ukrainian: Архипенко), also transliterated as Arkhipenko or Archipenko, is a Ukrainian-language family name of patronymic derivation from the Slavic first name Arkhyp/Arkhip (Архип),derived from the Greek name Archippus. The Belarusian-language version is Arkhipienka.

The surname may refer to:

- Alexander Archipenko (1887–1964), Ukrainian artist
- Eugene Archipenko (1884–1959), Ukrainian politician and agronomist
- Fyodor Arkhipenko (1921–2012), Soviet-Belarusian flying ace
- Vasyl Arkhypenko (born 1957), Soviet-Ukrainian athlete

== See also ==
- 6535 Archipenko, asteroid
