= Arkhipov =

Arkhipov (Russian: Архипов), or Arkhipova (feminine; Архипова) is a Russian surname that is derived from the male given name Arkhip and literally means Arkhip's.

== Arkhipov ==
- Abram Arkhipov (1862–1930), Russian realist painter
- Aleksey Arkhipov (born 1983), Russian football midfielder
- Anton Arkhipov (footballer, born 1985), Russian football striker
- Artyom Arkhipov (born 1996), Russian football player
- Denis Arkhipov (born 1979), Russian ice hockey centre
- Dmitry Arkhipov (ice hockey) (born 1993) is a Russian ice hockey player
- Evgeny Arkhipov (born 1992), Russian curler
- Igor Arkhipov (born 1953), Russian politician
- Ivan Arkhipov (1907–1998), Soviet politician
- Vasily Arkhipov (1926–1998), Soviet naval officer in the Cuban missile crisis
- Vasily Arkhipov (general) (1906–1985), Soviet tank brigade commander and twice Hero of the Soviet Union
- Vladimir Arkhipov (1933–2004) Soviet army general

== Arkhipova ==
- Anna Arkhipova (born 1973), Russian basketball player
- Lyudmila Arkhipova (born 1978), Russian race walker
- Maria Arkhipova (born 1983), Russian metal musician
- Nina Arkhipova (1921–2016), Soviet and Russian film and stage actress
- Irina Arkhipova (1925–2010), Soviet opera singer & People's Artist of the USSR
- Tatyana Petrova Arkhipova (born 1983), Russian runner

== See also ==
- 4424 Arkhipova, asteroid
