= AD 85 =

AD 85 in various calendars
- Gregorian calendar: AD 85; LXXXV
- Ab urbe condita: 838
- Assyrian calendar: 4835
- Balinese saka calendar: 6–7
- Bengali calendar: −509 – −508
- Berber calendar: 1035
- Buddhist calendar: 629
- Burmese calendar: −553
- Byzantine calendar: 5593–5594
- Chinese calendar: 甲申年 (Wood Monkey); 2782 or 2575 — to — 乙酉年 (Wood Rooster); 2783 or 2576
- Coptic calendar: −199 – −198
- Discordian calendar: 1251
- Ethiopian calendar: 77–78
- Hebrew calendar: 3845–3846
- Hindu calendars
- Vikram Samvat: 141–142
- Shaka Samvat: 6–7
- Kali Yuga: 3185–3186
- Holocene calendar: 10085
- Iranian calendar: 537 BP – 536 BP
- Islamic calendar: 554 BH – 552 BH
- Javanese calendar: N/A
- Julian calendar: AD 85; LXXXV
- Korean calendar: 2418
- Minguo calendar: 1827 before ROC 民前1827年
- Nanakshahi calendar: −1383
- Seleucid era: 396/397 AG
- Thai solar calendar: 627–628
- Tibetan calendar: ཤིང་ཕོ་སྤྲེ་ལོ་ (male Wood-Monkey); 211 or −170 or −942 — to — ཤིང་མོ་བྱ་ལོ་ (female Wood-Bird); 212 or −169 or −941

AD 85 (LXXXV) was a common year starting on Saturday of the Julian calendar. At the time, it was known as the Year of the Consulship of Augustus and Fulvus (or, less frequently, year 838 Ab urbe condita). The denomination AD 85 for this year has been used since the early medieval period, when the Anno Domini calendar era became the prevalent method in Europe for naming years.

== Events ==
=== By place ===
==== Roman Empire ====
- Emperor Domitian repulses a Dacian invasion of Moesia.
- Dacians under Decebalus engage in two wars against the Romans from this year to AD 88 or 89.
- Domitian appoints himself censor for life, which gives him the right to control the Senate. His totalitarian tendencies put the senatorial aristocracy firmly in opposition to him.

==== Asia ====
- Baekje invades the outskirts of Silla in the Korean Peninsula. The war continues until the peace treaty of 105.

== Births ==
- Marcion of Sinope, Greek theologian and founder of Marcionism (d. 160)
- Vibia Matidia (the Younger), Roman noblewoman (approximate date)

== Deaths ==
- Gaius Oppius Sabinus, Roman politician and governor
- Lucius Mindius, Roman politician and aristocrat
- Titus Atilius Rufus, Roman politician and governor
