= Arkhypchuk =

Arkhypchuk or Arkhipchuk is a Ukrainian-language family name of patronymic derivation from the Slavic first name Arkhyp/Arkhip (Архип) derived from the Greek name Archippus.

- Vadym Arkhypchuk (1937–1973), Ukrainian sprinter
- Serhiy Arkhypchuk (1960–2023), Ukrainian stage director
