= Arhip =

Arhip is a Romanian surname derived from the Greek name Ἄρχιππος Archippos/Archippus "master of horses".

- Dmitri Arhip, Moldovan rugby union player
- Victor Arhip, Moldovan and Russian professional rugby union player
- Ioan Arhip (1890–1980), Romanian major general
