= Philemon (biblical figure) =

Recipient of the Epistle to Philemon

Saint Philemon
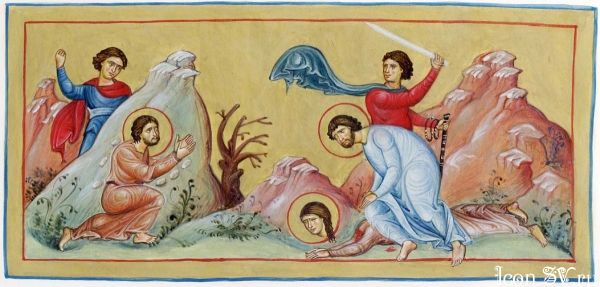

Equal to the Apostles (Eastern Orthodox) Martyr (Latin Church)
- Died: AD 68; Colossae, Asia, Roman Empire
- Venerated in: Eastern Orthodox Church; Catholic Church; Lutheranism
- Feast: 22 November (Eastern Orthodox and Latin Catholic); February 15 (Lutheran)

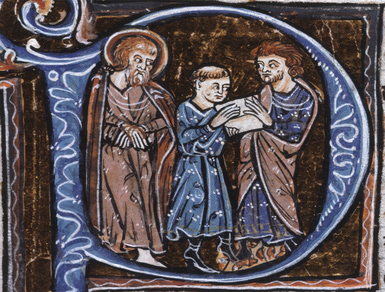
Decorated initial with Paul, Onesimus (delivering letter) and Philemon

Philemon (/fɪˈliːmən, faɪ-/; Ancient Greek: Φιλήμων, Philḗmōn) was an early Christian in Asia Minor who was the recipient of a private letter from Paul of Tarsus which forms part of the Christian New Testament. This letter is known as Epistle to Philemon, although it is addressed "to Philemon, our dear friend and fellow worker, also to Apphia our sister (possibly Philemon's wife) and Archippus our fellow soldier, and to the church that meets in your home". Paul asks Philemon to "take back" Onesimus, who may previously have been his slave.

Philemon is known as a saint by several Christian churches along with Apphia (or Appia), seen as his wife. Philemon was a wealthy Christian and a minister (possibly a bishop).

The Menaia of 22 November speak of Philemon as a holy apostle who, in company with Apphia, Archippus, and Onesimus, had been martyred at Colossae during the first general persecution in the reign of Nero. In the list of the Seventy Apostles, attributed to Dorotheus of Tyre, Philemon is described as bishop of Gaza.
