= Arkhipienka =

Arkhipienka or Arkhipenka (Belarusian: Архіпенка, Łacinka: Archipienka), is a Belarusian-language version of Ukrainian family name Arkhipenko, of patronymic derivation from the Slavic first name Arkhyp/Arkhip.

The surname may refer to:

- Hanna Arkhipenka, Belarusian pentathlete
