= Onesimus =

Christian saint mentioned in the New Testament

Saint Onesimus
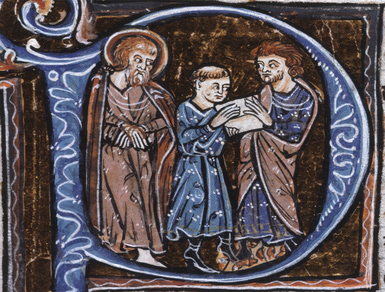
- Decorated initial with Paul, Onesimus (delivering letter) and Philemon
- Died: Rome, Roman Italy
- Venerated in: Catholic Church; Eastern Orthodox Church; Oriental Orthodox Church; Lutheranism
- Feast: 15 February (formerly 16 February in the West)

Onesimus (Ancient Greek: Ὀνήσιμος, romanized: Onēsimos, meaning "useful") was a Christian mentioned in the New Testament. He was a slave to Philemon, a Christian, and is the subject of Paul's Epistle to Philemon.

He may also be the same Onesimus mentioned by Ignatius of Antioch (died c. 107) as bishop in Ephesus. Eastern Orthodox tradition also list an Onesimus as the third bishop of Byzantium.

== In the New Testament ==
The name "Onesimus" appears in two of Paul's epistles. The Epistle to Philemon was written by Paul the Apostle to Philemon concerning a runaway slave named Onesimus. Onesimus turned up where Paul was imprisoned (Rome or Caesarea Maritima) to escape punishment for a theft of which he was accused. After hearing the Gospel from Paul, Onesimus converted to Christianity. Paul, having earlier converted Philemon to Christianity, sought to reconcile the two by writing the letter to Philemon which today exists in the New Testament. The letter reads (in 1:10-16):

I appeal to you for my son Onesimus, whom I have begotten while in my chains, who once was useless to you, but now is useful to you and to me. I am sending him back. You therefore receive him, that is, my own heart, whom I wished to keep with me, that on your behalf he might minister to me in my chains for the gospel. But without your consent I wanted to do nothing, that your good deed might not be by compulsion, as it were, but voluntary. For perhaps he departed for a while for this purpose, that you might receive him forever, no longer as a slave but more than a slave — a beloved brother, especially to me but how much more to you, both in the flesh and in the Lord.

In this passage Paul is offering a subtle and implicit wordplay on the name of Philemon’s runaway slave Onesimus Ὀνήσιμος (“Useful”) by referring to him as “the one once useless (ἄχρηστος) to you, but now useful (εὔχρηστος) [both] to you and to me.” Paul follows this wordplay up a few verses later (Phlm 20) with a figura etymologica on Onesimus’s name: in his exclamation to Philemon—ἐγώ σου ὀναίμην “may I gain some use from you”—he uses a rare verbal form of the word at the root of Onesimus’s name, ὀνίνημι, which is attested only here in the New Testament. By “gaining some use” (ὀναίμην) Paul means that he wishes to gain the services of “Mr. Useful” (Ὀνήσιμος).

In the Epistle to the Colossians 4:9 a person of this name is identified as a Christian accompanying Tychicus to visit the Christians in Colossae; nothing else is stated about him in this context. He may well be the freed Onesimus from the Epistle to Philemon.

== In tradition ==
He may also be the same Onesimus named by Ignatius of Antioch (died c. 107) as bishop in Ephesus In his Epistle written to the Ephesians while on his way to be executed in Rome, Ignatius wrote:

I received, therefore, your whole multitude in the name of God, through Onesimus, whose love surpasses words, in the flesh as your bishop. I pray that you may love him with a love according to Jesus Christ and that you may all be like him. For blessed is He Who granted unto you, worthy as you are, to possess such a bishop.

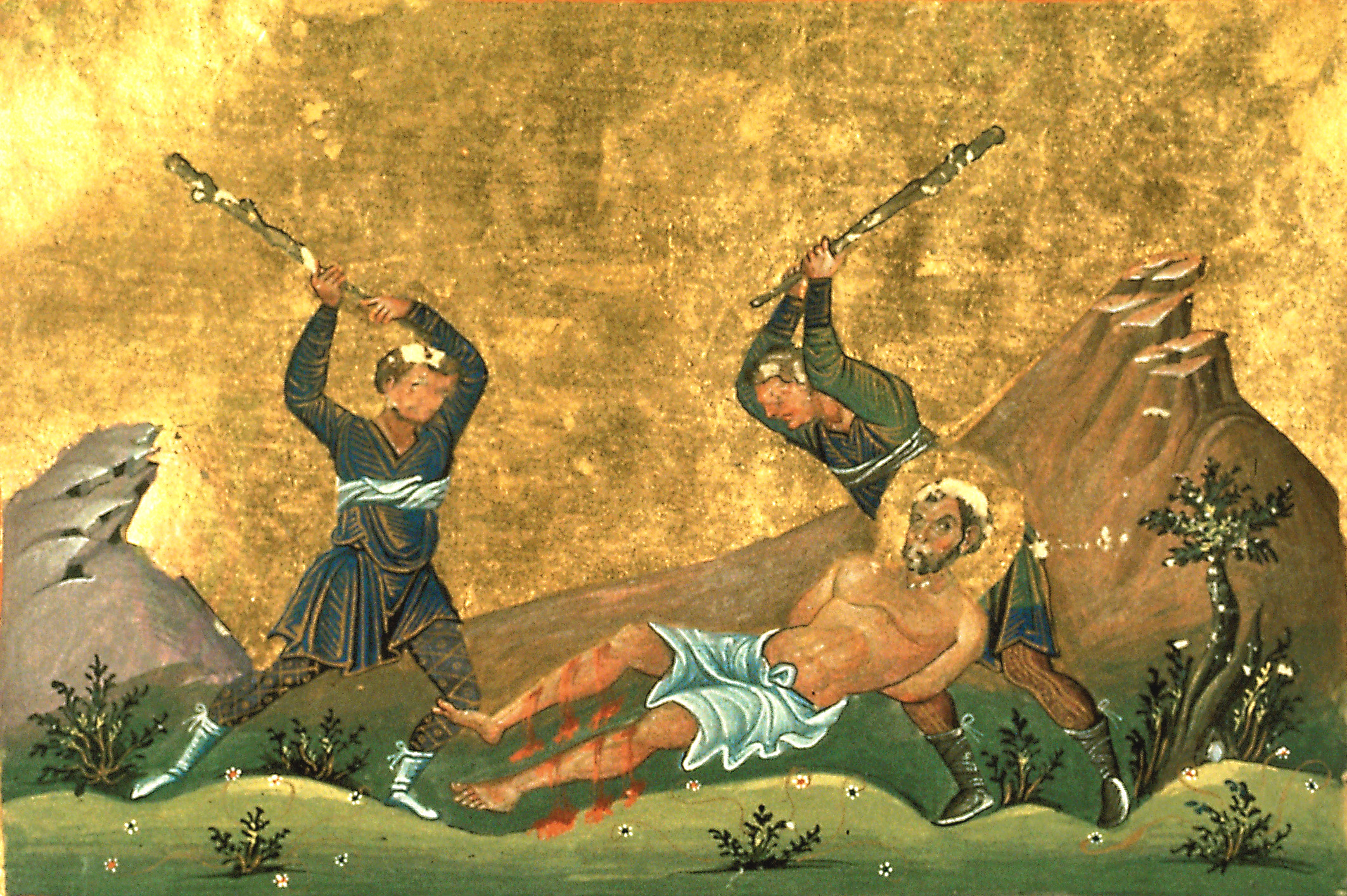
Painting depicting death of Onesimus, from the Menologion of Basil II (c. 1000 AD)

Onesimus must have accepted episcopal see of Ephesus following Saint Timothy. If so, Onesimus went from slave to brother to bishop. According to Tradition, Onesimus was imprisoned and may have been martyred by stoning (some sources claim he was beheaded). Given that Ignatius of Antioch died under Emperor Trajan (97-117), Onesimus's death more likely fell under that Emperor as well.

The 4th-century Apostolic Constitutions (VII, 46) mention Onesimus as the first bishop of Beroea in Macedonia.

Eastern Orthodox tradition also list an Onesimus as the third bishop of Byzantium, dating his reign from 54 to 68 AD. However, the authenticity of the first 25 bishops of Byzantium are met with skepticism by scholars as "there is no evidence of any significant Christian community at Byzantium before Metrophanes of Byzantium".

Saint Onesimus of Byzantium
- Bishop of Byzantium
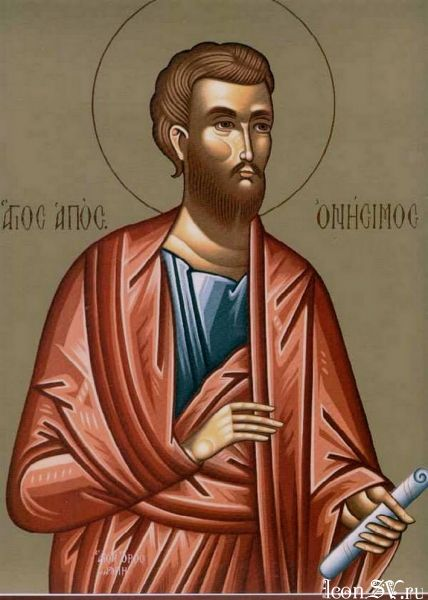
- Saint Onesimus
- Installed: 54 AD
- Term ended: 68 AD
- Predecessor: Stachys the Apostle
- Successor: Polycarpus I of Byzantium

Personal details
- Died: c. 107 AD
- Denomination: Christianity

== Veneration ==
Onesimus is regarded as a saint by many Christian denominations.

=== Catholic Church ===
The traditional Western commemoration of Onesimus is on 16 February. But in the 2004 edition of the Roman Martyrology, Onesimus is listed under 15 February. There, he is described as "[a] runaway slave, whom the apostle Paul received to the faith of Christ while in prison, regarding him as a son of whom he had become father, as he himself wrote to Philemon, Onesimus's master".

=== Eastern Orthodox Church ===
The Eastern Orthodox Church commemorates Onesimus on a variety of dates:

- 15 February: Primary Feast Day;
- 4 January: Synaxis of the Seventy Apostles.
- 6 July: The Apostles Philemon, Archippus, and Onesimus.
- 22 November: The Apostles Philemon, Archippus, Onesimus, and equal-to-the-apostles Apphia.

=== Lutheran Churches ===
The Lutheran Church–Missouri Synod commemorates him and Philemon on 15 February.

== See also ==
- Christianity and slavery, relative to Paul's attitude on slavery
