= Cohors I Aquitanorum veterana =

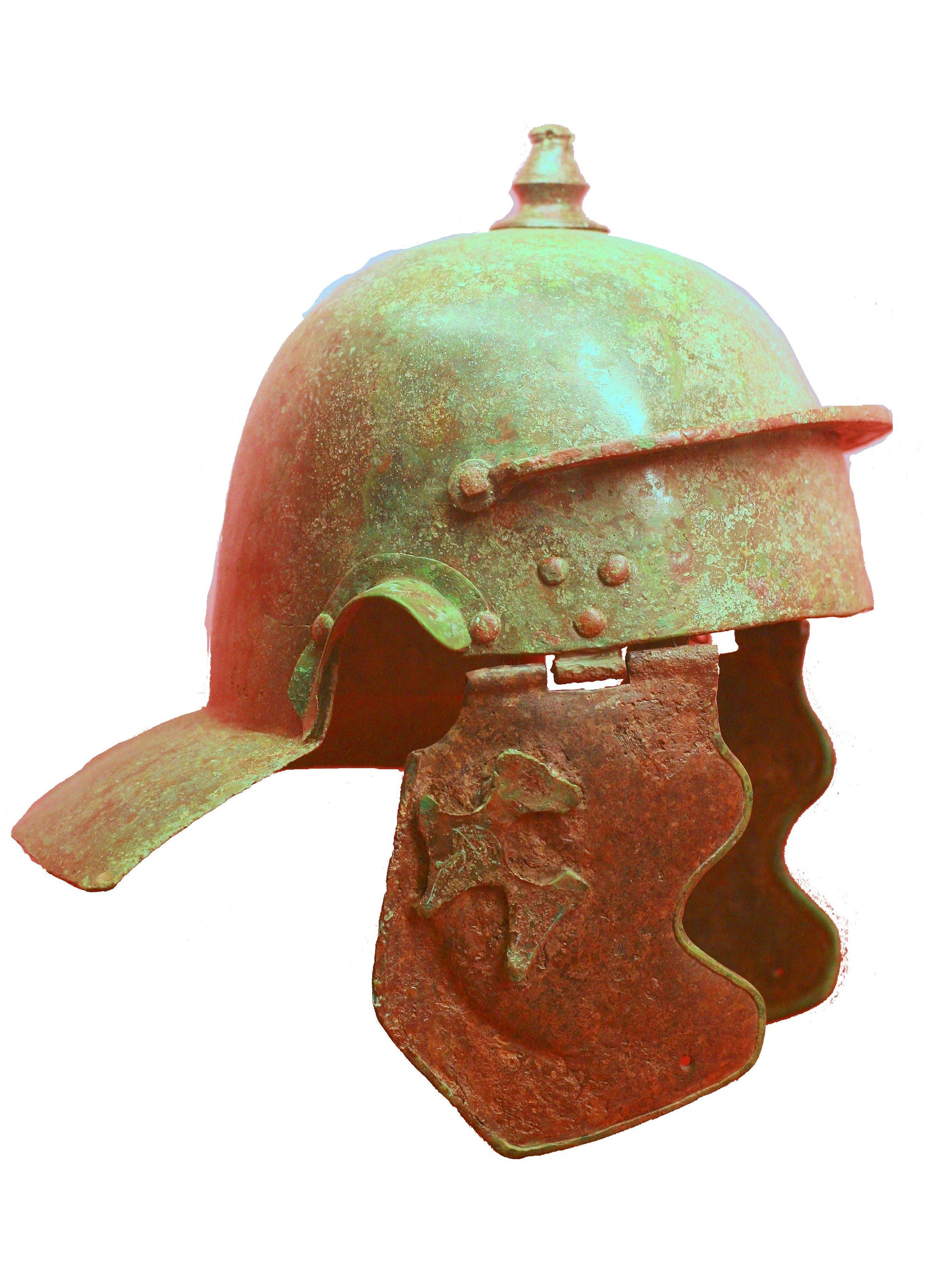
- Roman infantry helmet (late 1st century)
- Active: 20s BC to at least AD 213
- Country: Roman Empire
- Type: Roman auxiliary cohort
- Role: infantry
- Size: 480 men
- Garrison/HQ: Germania Superior 74–213

Cohors prima Aquitanorum veterana ("1st veteran Cohort of Aquitani") was a Roman auxiliary infantry regiment. It was probably originally raised in Gallia Aquitania in the reign of founder-emperor Augustus after the revolt of the Aquitani was suppressed in 26 BC. Unlike most Gauls, the Aquitani were not Celtic-speaking but spoke Aquitanian, a now extinct non- Indo-European language closely related to Basque.

The regiment was initially sent to the Danubian region, where it presumably saw action in the conquest of the Pannonii in 9–6 BC. It first appears in the datable epigraphic record in AD 74, when it was stationed in Germania Superior (Pfalz/Alsace). It remained there until at least the early 3rd century, when it is attested by a votive altar dedicated in 213–6. The following Roman forts have yielded inscriptions attesting the regiment: Arnsburg, Butzbach, Friedburg, Kleestadt, Saalburg and Stockstadt am Main. The latter has the only datable inscription, 213–6.

The names of several praefecti (regimental commanders) are preserved, of which two have discernible origins: I. Rufus Papirianus Sentius Gemellus from Berytos (Beirut, Lebanon) and L. Caecilius Caecilianus from Thaenae (Sfax, Tunisia), both undatable. A pedes (ranker foot soldier) is recorded from Ancyra (Ankara, Turkey) and a Thracian eques (cavalryman).

== Scholarly controversy ==
There is scholarly controversy about whether there were one or two infantry cohortes called I Aquitanorum. This is because a regiment of that name is repeatedly attested both in Germania Superior and Britannia.

Paul Holder sees them as two separate units, one of which carried the title veterana and was permanently based in Germania Superior, the other in Britannia. John Spaul considers it more likely there was a single unit, which alternated between the two provinces, although this was unusual for auxiliary regiments. Holder's view is supported by the fact that none of the British inscriptions carry the title veterana, whereas several of the German ones do. Holder is followed here: this article concerns the unit in Germania Superior. For the unit in Britannia, see cohors I Aquitanorum.

== See also ==
- List of Roman auxiliary regiments
