= AD 89 =

AD 89 in various calendars
- Gregorian calendar: AD 89; LXXXIX
- Ab urbe condita: 842
- Assyrian calendar: 4839
- Balinese saka calendar: 10–11
- Bengali calendar: −505 – −504
- Berber calendar: 1039
- Buddhist calendar: 633
- Burmese calendar: −549
- Byzantine calendar: 5597–5598
- Chinese calendar: 戊子年 (Earth Rat); 2786 or 2579 — to — 己丑年 (Earth Ox); 2787 or 2580
- Coptic calendar: −195 – −194
- Discordian calendar: 1255
- Ethiopian calendar: 81–82
- Hebrew calendar: 3849–3850
- Hindu calendars
- Vikram Samvat: 145–146
- Shaka Samvat: 10–11
- Kali Yuga: 3189–3190
- Holocene calendar: 10089
- Iranian calendar: 533 BP – 532 BP
- Islamic calendar: 549 BH – 548 BH
- Javanese calendar: N/A
- Julian calendar: AD 89; LXXXIX
- Korean calendar: 2422
- Minguo calendar: 1823 before ROC 民前1823年
- Nanakshahi calendar: −1379
- Seleucid era: 400/401 AG
- Thai solar calendar: 631–632
- Tibetan calendar: ས་ཕོ་བྱི་བ་ལོ་ (male Earth-Rat); 215 or −166 or −938 — to — ས་མོ་གླང་ལོ་ (female Earth-Ox); 216 or −165 or −937

AD 89 (LXXXIX) was a common year starting on Thursday of the Julian calendar. At the time, it was known as the Year of the Consulship of Fulvus and Atratinus (or, less frequently, year 842 Ab urbe condita). The denomination AD 89 for this year has been used since the early medieval period, when the Anno Domini calendar era became the prevalent method in Europe for naming years.

== Events ==
=== By place ===
==== Europe ====
- January 1 – Lucius Antonius Saturninus incites a revolt against Emperor Domitian (it is suppressed by January 24).
- Legio XIII Gemina is transferred to Dacia, to help in the war against King Decebalus.
- Aquincum (old Budapest, Óbuda) is founded (approximate date).

==== Asia ====
- First year of Yongyuan era of the Chinese Han dynasty.
- June – Battle of Ikh Bayan: The Han Chinese army under Dou Xian, allied with the southern Xiongnu, is victorious over the Northern Xiongnu.

=== By topic ===
==== Religion ====
- Polycarpus I, Greek bishop of Byzantium, dies after a 20-year reign and is succeeded by Plutarch.

== Births ==
- Sindae, Korean ruler of Goguryeo (d. 179)

== Deaths ==
- Lucius Antonius Saturninus, Roman politician and general
- Polycarpus I, Greek bishop of Byzantium
