= Cohors I Aquitanorum =

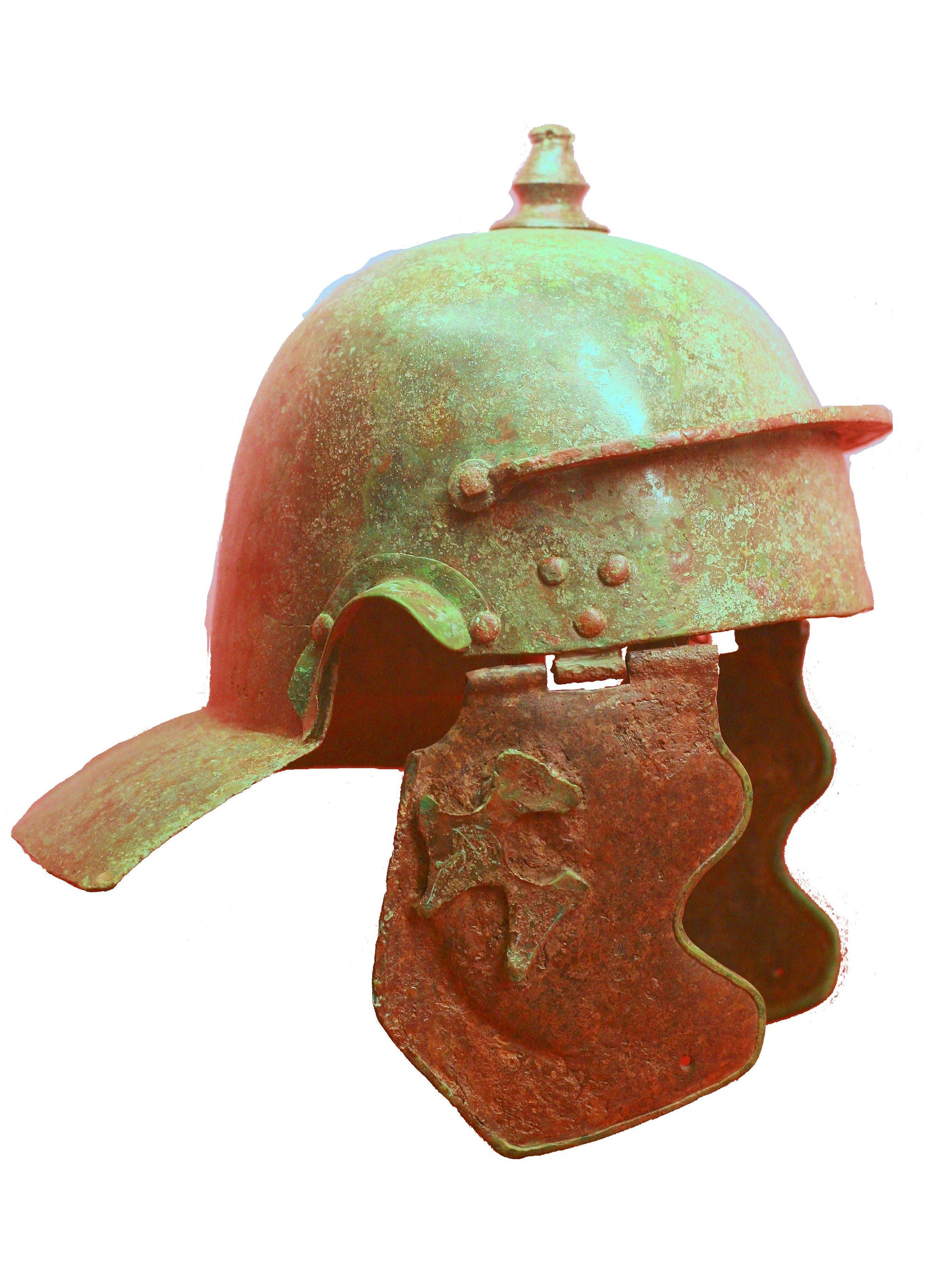
- Roman infantry helmet (late 1st century)
- Active: early 1st century to 4th century
- Country: Roman Empire
- Type: Roman auxiliary cohort
- Role: infantry
- Size: 480 men
- Garrison/HQ: Germania Superior 84–122; Britannia 122 – 4th century

Cohors prima Aquitanorum ("1st Cohort of Aquitani") was a Roman auxiliary infantry regiment. It was probably originally raised in Gallia Aquitania in the reign of founder-emperor Augustus after the revolt of the Aquitani was suppressed in 26 BC. Unlike most Gauls, the Aquitani were not Celtic-speaking but spoke Aquitanian, a now extinct non Indo-European language closely related to Basque.

There is scholarly controversy about whether there were one or two infantry cohortes called I Aquitanorum. This is because a regiment of that name is repeatedly attested both in Germania Superior and Britannia. Holder sees them as two separate units, one of which carried the title veterana and was permanently based in Germania Sup., the other in Britannia. Spaul considers it more likely there was a single unit, which alternated between the two provinces, although this was unusual for auxiliary regiments. Holder's view is supported by the fact that none of the British inscriptions carry the title veterana, whereas several of the German ones do, and so appears more likely. Holder is followed here: this article concerns the unit stationed in Britannia. For the unit in Germania Superior see cohors I Aquitanorum veterana.

The regiment was probably stationed on the Rhine frontier from an early stage. It first appears in the datable epigraphic record in 82 AD in Germania, if this record does not relate to its namesake unit. The regiment is first attested in Britannia in 122, probably transferred to the island along with several other regiments to help in the construction of Hadrian's Wall (122–32). The regiment remained in Britain into the 4th century, as it left an inscription in the Saxon Shore fort of Branodunum (Brancaster, Norfolk). The regiments is attested in the following Roman forts in Britain: Bakewell, Brancaster (4th century), Brough-on-Noe (158), Carrawburgh.

Although a few names of praefecti (commanders) of the regiment have been preserved, none have a certain origin. One miles (common soldier) has a partially preserved origin "Cam-". This may be Camulodunum (Colchester).

== See also ==
- List of Roman auxiliary regiments
