= Moscow Research Center for Human Rights =

The Moscow Research Center for Human Rights (MRCHR) is an umbrella group for human rights groups. It was set up in 1993. The Center unites about a dozen human rights nongovernmental organizations.

The idea for the MRCHR grew out of a desire to collectively organize the human rights-related movements emerging from the loosely-structured community of informal social organizations which flowered during the last part of the Soviet period. A group of human rights activists, dissidents and former political prisoners acquired office space in which to work. The group soon found financial and moral support from the West, including the National Endowment for Democracy, Phare, and various private foundations. After receiving a series of small grants, the Center gradually emerged as a focal point for human rights work in 1993.

== Funding ==
The America's Development Foundation set up "An institutional partnership program in Russia with the Moscow Research Center for Human Rights (MCHR) provided the framework for strengthening the capacity of this coalition of Russian human rights NGOs, and significantly extending its network."

"From 1993 – 1997, ADF carried out significant work with the Moscow Research Center for Human Rights (MRCHR), an umbrella organization of fifteen human rights organizations established in 1991 to jointly promote human rights and improve the rule of law throughout the Russian Federation. With generous backing from several private foundations and the Institutional Partnership Program of the USAID Bureau for Europe and the New Independent States, ADF helped MRCHR reach beyond Moscow to become a nationwide organization, with positive results for the cause of increasing human rights awareness and protection in Russia."

Director of the center is Alexey Smirnov, and its chairmen is Boris Altshuler . Advisory Board of the Center includes Vyacheslav Bakhmin, Elena Bonner, Valeriy Borschov, Sergei Kovalev and Anatoly Pristavkin
