= Architectural Institute in Prague =

Private architecture school in Prague

- Type: Private school
- Established: 2010
- Rector: Regina Loukotová
- Academic staff: ~45 (2025)
- Administrative staff: ~10 (2025)
- Students: ~90 (2025)
- Address: Horská 2040/3, Prague, Czech Republic
- Website: www.archip.eu//

Architectural Institute In Prague (ARCHIP) is a private international school of architecture in Prague, Czech Republic, established in 2010.

The school offers instruction only in English and has an emphasis on international students and faculty. ARCHIP has recently moved to the CIEE building in the historic fort of Vyšehrad in the Prague 2 district.

== History ==
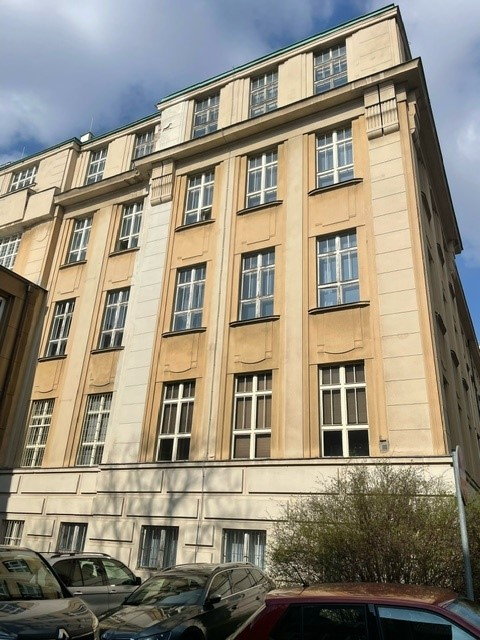

The school was conceived in 2005 by architect Martin Roubík (1949–2008) and his wife Regina Loukotová, now rector of the school. Roubík had returned from a period teaching and working in Oslo, and the couple wanted to establish a school of architecture in the Czech Republic offering a bachelor's degree programme in English.

The school received approval to open from the Ministry of Education in May 2010, and opened its Bachelor's degree programme in October 2011. In 2015 the school opened a 2-year Master's degree programme entitled "Architecture and Urbanism".

ARCHIP has moved several times, its first location being the Trade Fair Palace, the largest National Gallery Prague site. In 2012, the school relocated to the Kartografie Praha building around the corner. Five years later, ARCHIP moved into a new campus in a renovated factory next to the DOX Centre for Contemporary Art.

As a result of the COVID-19 pandemic, ARCHIP moved again in 2020 to the CIEE building in Štulcova street, within the walls of the historic Vyšehrad fort in the Prague 2 district.

== Academics ==
The school has around 50 teachers, about two thirds of whom are Czech, and the rest from abroad. Class sizes are between 20 and 30 students.

The school's study programme is based on a vertical studio model where students from different grades work in parallel on a single site and programme. The students also attend lectures, practical seminars, and participate in excursions and workshops. Instruction takes place in Prague and occasionally at architectural projects in other parts of the Czech Republic, such as in the Bohemian towns of Líbeznice and Jenišov (2020) or the Romani Holocaust memorial in Lety (2019).

The school has a small exhibition space and a library, and also hosts lectures from local and international architects in cooperation with the Prague-based Center of Architecture and Town Planning (CAMP).

The school's credit system and classification scale are compatible with the European Credit Transfer System (ECTS), allowing students to join other European education programmes through the Erasmus programme. ARCHIP has various international partners, mostly based in Scandinavia and the United Kingdom but also in other regions of Europe.
