= Association for Democracy Assistance and Human Rights =

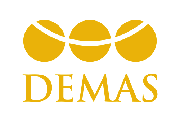
DEMAS logo

The Association for Democracy Assistance and Human Rights (DEMAS) (Czech: Asociace pro podporu demokracie a lidských práv) is a Czech organization founded in 2008 which is an amalgamation of 11 NGOs and 5 observer status organizations. DEMAS, and the organizations within focus on supporting democracy and upholding human and civil rights within the Czech republic and internationally. They state their mission as being "Ready to serve the cause of democracy, human rights and civil society whenever and wherever the need arises." Funding for DEMAS initially came mostly from the Czech Republic government, and through programs meant to offer funding for NGOs, such as the National Endowment for Democracy (NED). NED funding is given out by the Czech Ministry of Foreign Affairs. DEMAS is also funded by the European Union, European Commission, private donors, and other governmental grants and funds.

DEMAS works with other NGOs and groups through both local and international partners to undertake the work of assisting them in their causes. They work to create links between Czech and international organizations, creating a transnational support network for NGOs. In addition to allowing NGOs to work around possible blocking factors in their countries that prevent them from doing their work, DEMAS also works to help other organizations obtain funding. They also organize and host seminars and workshops on human and civil rights, and democracy.

== Funding ==
Each organization participating within DEMAS has their own independent forms and initiatives for funding; some are non-profit, and others funded entirely by private donation. DEMAS was initially funded by the Czech ministry of foreign affairs but is now supported by membership fees, private donations and grants for which it qualifies. DEMAS is fiscally independent from any government and so all action and initiatives undertaken by the organization are decided internally from members of the organization. DEMAS is one of many organizations that are in part funded by NED (National Endowment for Democracy); NED are a non-profit organization funded by the US government to give grants and funding to organizations who focus on democracy.

== Activities ==
DEMAS produces annual reports on the activities and actions of its member organizations which outline their work and initiatives, and plans for the future. Their first report was produced 1 year after their creation (2008) in 2009 and they have continued producing them through 2016, with their 2012 report being the largest they have ever produced. They work in conjunction with many of their partners to host a multitude of public events every year to maintain public awareness and interaction with many of the issues they are working towards. They are also a consistent participant in the annual NGO market put on by one of their members, Forum 2000, where they serve to interact with the general public and hand out educational material on the work of their member NGOs, organizations, and their missions; this is their largest activity apart from creating a space for information sharing, to raise awareness and start conversations about democracy in the public sphere.

== Role ==
DEMAS serves as a body in which all members can freely interact and support one another, allowing for the creation of smaller networks within the overarching network of DEMAS itself. This results in a large transnational network of organizations with similar missions and initiatives or skills that help increase professionalism and expertise for each organization, to more effectively run their undertakings and support of democracy, especially for organizations who operate in hostile environments. This large network of support allows each group to have more influence at home and abroad, which in turn allows them to have a larger positive impact. DEMAS also act as a partner with their members in setting up and hosting debates, seminars, summits, conferences, and workshops, throughout the year many members of DEMAS such as Forum 2000 host summits or other events that are often mediated by DEMAS as well as promoted by them. Without the support that is available, many organizations may not have near the influence or effectiveness they have due to their vast support of knowledgeable organizations.

== Staff ==
=== Board of directors ===
Sylva Horáková

Jakub Klepal

Pavel Pšeja (chairman)

Marek Svoboda (Vice-chairperson)

Vladimíra Votavová

=== Executive director ===
Sabina Malcová

=== Project Coordinator ===
Veronika Soporská

== Members ==
DEMAS has 16 participating members (including observer status members):

Agora (Central Europe) are focused on promoting and improving standards and methods involved with political life in the Czech Republic, post-Soviet satellites, and the Balkan states. The organization holds town halls, panels, professional training conferences, as well as other activities meant to promote democracy. Agora serves as a bridge of contact between the people and their multiple levels of government, as well as governments of their regional neighbors.

Amnesty International CZ (Czech) are a large International organization with millions of members from all around the world, with many regions and countries having their own sections. They are an organization that campaign for a wide range of issues from women's rights, public economic and socio-economic rights, and many others. The Czech chapter of Amnesty International is the largest contributor to DEMAS from under the banner of Amnesty International.

Association for International Affairs (AMO) are an organization that conducts research and offers education to other organizations on international affairs. They open themselves up to serve as a platform which allows economic, academic, and governmental organizations and figures to meet, learn, and discuss international affairs.

Caritas of the Archdiocese of Prague are a religious organization that serve to help the homeless, at-risk people, the elderly, and victims of crime, they also provide humanitarian aid to Sub-Saharan countries and India. They work to make connections with other churches and religious organizations abroad, serving to expand a transnational network of religious organizations.

CASLA Institute Prague are an NGO that focuses on the study of Latin America and serves as DEMAS' arm into Latin America which serves to spread and strengthen democracy in South America, as well as participate actively in human rights campaigning.

CEELI Institute is a non-profit organization that provides professional legal education. They work to spread and strengthen understanding and implementation of law, through working with local and foreign judiciary bodies.

Center for Community Organizing (CpKP) are an NGO that work with local governments within the European Union, providing to them assistance and education with EU policy and policy changes. They have a focus on public programs and initiatives like housing developments, public spaces, and economic planning.

CEVRO is an NGO that works to support politicians and democracy by providing seminars, workshops, and other activities to build up skills that support democracy.

Democracy and Culture Studies Center (CDK) is a non-profit organization that took up the initiatives of publishing and monitoring of democracy prior to 1989.

Forum 2000 Foundation works to continue the legacy of Václav Havel who was the first democratic president of the Czech Republic, by promoting democracy, human rights, religious and ethnic tolerance and development. They serve as a platform for world leaders to discuss and debate these specific issues.

Institute for European Policy (Europeum) is an independent think-tank focused on the issue of European integration, working to research and publish reports to introduce ideas about integration into the European Union governmental body.

International Association Civic Belarus works to support NGOs in Belarus who do not have legal permission to operate under their current government (that of Alexander Lukashenka). They create connections for these NGOs with Czech organizations to promote cooperation and transfer of social and political expertise.

PASOS, the Policy Association for an Open Society is a collection of 30 independent think tanks from Europe and Asia that work to promote an open society, democracy, and human rights. Together they publish reports that serve to outline the challenges that stand in the way of an open society.

People in Need (PIN) are an organization that provides and creates social programs to help those in need in the Czech Republic and post-Soviet states, as well as countries abroad. They also work to support NGOs that support democracy in unfriendly environments, as well as directly supporting dissidents in non-democratic countries. PIN also organize an annual film festival called the One World Documentary Film Festival, and awards the Homo Homini to someone who they deem to have shown personal courage and commitment to promoting democracy and human rights.

Transitions Online is an international publishing and media organization operating in the post-Soviet states that work to improve professionalism and cover news outside that of the mainstream media.

Transparency International CZ (TI-CZ) is an organization that fight against governmental corruption and provide legal education to the public about corruption in an effort to promote transparency and protect public interest. They operate in the Czech Republic, Egypt, Ukraine, and the Balkans.
