= Detroit Electronic Music Archive =

Coordinates: 42°21′30.9″N 83°4′0″W

The Detroit Electronic Music Archive (DEMA) began in June 2005 in Detroit, Michigan. It is housed in the Detroit Public Library. It is curated by Barbara Martin at the E. Azalia Hackley Collection.

The DEMA documents, collects, preserves, and disseminates information about Detroit's unique, continuing contribution to electronic dance music and promotes understanding of those contributions as originating within Detroit's African-American community.

The activities of the DEMA includes research, education and outreach programming, performance programming, and publications. These diverse services and resources impacts a wide range of audiences and constituencies, including academic researchers; musicians, composers, arrangers, and music directors; high school and grade school teachers and students; journalists and music writers; and filmmakers and television producers. The DEMA Archives, conferences, and DEMA performance programs are open to the public.

The DEMA was founded in recognition of a need to organize the incredibly scope and diversity of Detroit's electronic culture. The DEMA currently has no funding. With the help of the E. Azalia Hackley Collection (part of the Detroit Public Library) though the DEMA hopes to promote situations for fundraising and awareness.

== See also ==
- Techno music
