= Chariomerus =

1st-century chieftain of the Germanic Cherusci tribe

Chariomerus (fl. 1st century) is the last recorded chieftain of the Germanic Cherusci tribe.

== Life ==
Chariomerus appears only in the Roman History of Cassius Dio. Chariomerus succeeded Italicus as chieftain of the Cherusci sometime in the mid-1st century and was presumably his son, the rest of the dynasty having died out by the time of Italicus's ascension in AD 47. This would make him the grandnephew of Arminius, the Cherusci leader who defeated the Roman army in Teutonburg Forest in AD 9 but—like Italicus and Italicus's father Flavus—Chariomerus seems to have been a close ally of Rome. Defeated by the Chatti sometime around AD 88, Chariomerus was deposed by his own people for his Roman ties. He turned to the emperor Domitian for assistance recovering his rule. Domitian offered financial support but not soldiers. By the end of the 1st century, the Cherusci people had disappeared from treatments of Germany.
