= AD 88 =

AD 88 in various calendars
- Gregorian calendar: AD 88; LXXXVIII
- Ab urbe condita: 841
- Assyrian calendar: 4838
- Balinese saka calendar: 9–10
- Bengali calendar: −506 – −505
- Berber calendar: 1038
- Buddhist calendar: 632
- Burmese calendar: −550
- Byzantine calendar: 5596–5597
- Chinese calendar: 丁亥年 (Fire Pig); 2785 or 2578 — to — 戊子年 (Earth Rat); 2786 or 2579
- Coptic calendar: −196 – −195
- Discordian calendar: 1254
- Ethiopian calendar: 80–81
- Hebrew calendar: 3848–3849
- Hindu calendars
- Vikram Samvat: 144–145
- Shaka Samvat: 9–10
- Kali Yuga: 3188–3189
- Holocene calendar: 10088
- Iranian calendar: 534 BP – 533 BP
- Islamic calendar: 550 BH – 549 BH
- Javanese calendar: N/A
- Julian calendar: AD 88; LXXXVIII
- Korean calendar: 2421
- Minguo calendar: 1824 before ROC 民前1824年
- Nanakshahi calendar: −1380
- Seleucid era: 399/400 AG
- Thai solar calendar: 630–631
- Tibetan calendar: མེ་མོ་ཕག་ལོ་ (female Fire-Boar); 214 or −167 or −939 — to — ས་ཕོ་བྱི་བ་ལོ་ (male Earth-Rat); 215 or −166 or −938

AD 88 (LXXXVIII) was a leap year starting on Tuesday of the Julian calendar. At the time, it was known as the Year of the Consulship of Augustus and Rufus (or, less frequently, year 841 Ab urbe condita). The denomination AD 88 for this year has been used since the early medieval period, when the Anno Domini calendar era became the prevalent method in Europe for naming years.

== Events ==
=== By place ===
==== Roman Empire ====
- Two Egyptian obelisks are erected in Benevento in front of the Temple of Isis, in honour of Emperor Domitian.
- Quintilian retires from teaching and from pleading, to compose his great work on the training of the orator (Institutio Oratoria).
- The First Dacian War ends: Decebalus becomes a client king of Rome, he receives money, craftsmen and war machines to protect the borders (limes) of the Roman Empire.

==== Asia ====
- Emperor Han Zhangdi dies at age 31 after a 13-year reign in which Chinese military forces have become powerful enough to march against tribes who threaten their northern and western borders. Having used intrigue as well as armed might to achieve his ends, Zhangdi and his General Ban Chao have reestablished Chinese influence in Inner Asia, but court eunuchs have increased their power during the emperor's reign. Zhangdi is succeeded by his 9-year-old son Zhao, who will reign until 105 as emperor Han Hedi, but he will be a virtual pawn of Empress Dou (adoptive mother) and scheming courtiers who will effectively rule the Chinese Empire.
- Last year (4th) of yuanhe era and start of zhanghe era of the Chinese Eastern Han dynasty.

=== By topic ===
==== Religion ====
- Pope Clement I succeeds Pope Anacletus I as the fourth pope.

== Deaths ==
- Dou Gu, Chinese general of the Han dynasty
- Gaius Vettulenus Civica Cerealis, Roman politician
- Han Zhangdi, Chinese emperor of the Han dynasty (b. AD 57)
