= Ioan Arhip =

Romanian major general

Ioan Arhip (17 February 1890 – 4 August 1980) was a Romanian major general during World War II.

He was promoted to lieutenant colonel in May 1929, colonel in October 1935, and brigadier general in May 1940. In June 1940 he was awarded the Order of the Star of Romania, Officer rank. Arhip began his career as Deputy General Officer Commanding 3rd Division in January 1941. In May 1941 he was awarded the Order of the Crown, Commander rank.

After Romania entered the war on the side of the Axis, Arhip saw combat on the Eastern Front. In November 1941 he was awarded the Order of the Star, Grand Officer rank. In January 1942 he was promoted to general officer of the division. From February 1942 to September 1944, Arhip was Vice Chief General of Staff, and in May 1944 he was promoted to major general. He became the General Officer Commanding 15th Training Division in September–October 1944, and Director of Infantry later that year. He was appointed Deputy General Officer Commanding 2nd Corps area in December 1944, and went into reserve in March 1945.
