= AD 105 =

105 in various calendars
- Gregorian calendar: 105; CV
- Ab urbe condita: 858
- Assyrian calendar: 4855
- Balinese saka calendar: 26–27
- Bengali calendar: −489 – −488
- Berber calendar: 1055
- Buddhist calendar: 649
- Burmese calendar: −533
- Byzantine calendar: 5613–5614
- Chinese calendar: 甲辰年 (Wood Dragon); 2802 or 2595 — to — 乙巳年 (Wood Snake); 2803 or 2596
- Coptic calendar: −179 – −178
- Discordian calendar: 1271
- Ethiopian calendar: 97–98
- Hebrew calendar: 3865–3866
- Hindu calendars
- Vikram Samvat: 161–162
- Shaka Samvat: 26–27
- Kali Yuga: 3205–3206
- Holocene calendar: 10105
- Iranian calendar: 517 BP – 516 BP
- Islamic calendar: 533 BH – 532 BH
- Javanese calendar: N/A
- Julian calendar: 105; CV
- Korean calendar: 2438
- Minguo calendar: 1807 before ROC 民前1807年
- Nanakshahi calendar: −1363
- Seleucid era: 416/417 AG
- Thai solar calendar: 647–648
- Tibetan calendar: ཤིང་ཕོ་འབྲུག་ལོ་ (male Wood-Dragon); 231 or −150 or −922 — to — ཤིང་མོ་སྦྲུལ་ལོ་ (female Wood-Snake); 232 or −149 or −921

Year 105 (CV) was a common year starting on Wednesday of the Julian calendar. At the time, it was known as the Year of the Consulship of Candidus and Iulius (or, less frequently, year 858 Ab urbe condita). The denomination 105 for this year has been used since the early medieval period, when the Anno Domini calendar era became the prevalent method in Europe for naming years.

== Events ==
=== By place ===
==== Roman Empire ====
- Emperor Trajan starts the second expedition against Dacia; he leaves with the Imperial Roman fleet from Brundusium.
- Permanent castrum of Legio II Adiutrix at Aquincum (modern Budapest) in Pannonia.
- Legio XXX Ulpia Victrix and II Traiana Fortis are created by Trajan.
- The Romans conquer Kerak from the Nabateans.
- Pacorus II of Parthia dies after a 27-year reign, in which he has reclaimed all of his empire. His successor Vologases III reigns until 147 AD, suppressing brief rebellions, as he battles against the Kushan and Alani.

==== Asia ====
- Emperor He Di dies after a 17-year reign in which court eunuchs and the emperor's in-laws have regained influence. Empress Deng Sui places her son Shang Di (barely 3 months old) on the throne, as the fifth emperor of the Chinese Eastern Han dynasty.
- Last year (17th) of yongyuan era and start of yuanxing era of the Chinese Eastern Han dynasty.
- A peace treaty is signed between Baekje and Silla in the Korean Peninsula (the war started in AD 85).

=== By topic ===
==== Art and Science ====
- Papermaking is refined and officially created by the Chinese eunuch Cai Lun, who receives official praise from the emperor for his methods of making paper from tree bark, hemp, remnant rags, and fish nets. Occasionally, skin from cadavers was also spread as a final layer. Paper had been made in China from the 2nd century BC, but Cai Lun's paper provides a writing surface far superior to pure silk and is much less costly to produce. Bamboo and wooden slips will remain the usual materials for books and scrolls in most of the world for another 200 years, and paper will remain a Chinese secret for 500 years.
- The Trajan Bridge is finished. For more than a thousand years, it is the longest arch bridge in the world to have been built, in terms of both total and span length.

==== Religion ====
- Pope Alexander I succeeds Pope Evaristus as the sixth pope according to Roman Catholic tradition (approximate date).
- Change of Patriarch of Constantinople from Patriarch Plutarch to Patriarch Sedecion.

== Births ==
- Alexander of Abonoteichus, Greek mystic and oracle (d. 170)
- Han Shangdi, Chinese emperor of the Han dynasty (d. 106)
- Marcus Sedatius Severianus, Roman politician (d. 161)

== Deaths ==
- June 24 – Gnaeus Afranius Dexter, Roman politician
- Gnaeus Pompeius Longinus, Roman politician
- Marcus Valerius Probus, Roman grammarian
- Pacorus II, king of the Parthian Empire
- Plutarch, bishop of Byzantium

== Bibliography ==
- Tudor, D. (1974), "Le pont de Constantin le Grand à Celei", Les ponts romains du Bas-Danube, Bibliotheca Historica Romaniae Études, vol. 51, Bucharest: Editura Academiei Republicii Socialiste România, pp. 135–166
- Galliazzo, Vittorio (1994), I ponti romani. Catalogo generale, vol. 2, Treviso: Edizioni Canova, pp. 320–324 (No. 646), ISBN 88-85066-66-6
