= AD 83 =

AD 83 in various calendars
- Gregorian calendar: AD 83; LXXXIII
- Ab urbe condita: 836
- Assyrian calendar: 4833
- Balinese saka calendar: 4–5
- Bengali calendar: −511 – −510
- Berber calendar: 1033
- Buddhist calendar: 627
- Burmese calendar: −555
- Byzantine calendar: 5591–5592
- Chinese calendar: 壬午年 (Water Horse); 2780 or 2573 — to — 癸未年 (Water Goat); 2781 or 2574
- Coptic calendar: −201 – −200
- Discordian calendar: 1249
- Ethiopian calendar: 75–76
- Hebrew calendar: 3843–3844
- Hindu calendars
- Vikram Samvat: 139–140
- Shaka Samvat: 4–5
- Kali Yuga: 3183–3184
- Holocene calendar: 10083
- Iranian calendar: 539 BP – 538 BP
- Islamic calendar: 556 BH – 555 BH
- Javanese calendar: N/A
- Julian calendar: AD 83; LXXXIII
- Korean calendar: 2416
- Minguo calendar: 1829 before ROC 民前1829年
- Nanakshahi calendar: −1385
- Seleucid era: 394/395 AG
- Thai solar calendar: 625–626
- Tibetan calendar: ཆུ་ཕོ་རྟ་ལོ་ (male Water-Horse); 209 or −172 or −944 — to — ཆུ་མོ་ལུག་ལོ་ (female Water-Sheep); 210 or −171 or −943

AD 83 (LXXXIII) was a common year starting on Wednesday of the Julian calendar. At the time, it was known as the Year of the Consulship of Augustus and Quintus Petillius Rufus (or, less frequently, year 836 Ab urbe condita). The denomination AD 83 for this year has been used since the early medieval period, when the Anno Domini calendar era became the prevalent method in Europe for naming years. In AD 83 the Julian year accumulated a one-day difference from tropical year.

== Events ==
=== By place ===
==== Roman Empire ====
- Possible date of the Battle of Mons Graupius (AD 83 or 84): According to Tacitus, 10,000 Britons and 360 Romans are killed.
- Emperor Domitian fights the Chatti, a Germanic tribe. His victory allows the construction of fortifications (Limes) along the Rhine-frontier.
- The Roman fort Inchtuthil is built in Scotland.
- Domitian is, again, also a Roman Consul.
- Possible date that Demetrius of Tarsus visits an island in the Hebrides populated by holy men, possibly druids.
- In Rome, the castration of slaves is prohibited.

== Births ==
- Vibia Sabina, Roman empress (d. c. 136)

== Deaths ==
- Marcus Pompeius Silvanus, Roman politician
- Pomponia Graecina, Roman noblewoman
