= AD 84 =

AD 84 in various calendars
- Gregorian calendar: AD 84; LXXXIV
- Ab urbe condita: 837
- Assyrian calendar: 4834
- Balinese saka calendar: 5–6
- Bengali calendar: −510 – −509
- Berber calendar: 1034
- Buddhist calendar: 628
- Burmese calendar: −554
- Byzantine calendar: 5592–5593
- Chinese calendar: 癸未年 (Water Goat); 2781 or 2574 — to — 甲申年 (Wood Monkey); 2782 or 2575
- Coptic calendar: −200 – −199
- Discordian calendar: 1250
- Ethiopian calendar: 76–77
- Hebrew calendar: 3844–3845
- Hindu calendars
- Vikram Samvat: 140–141
- Shaka Samvat: 5–6
- Kali Yuga: 3184–3185
- Holocene calendar: 10084
- Iranian calendar: 538 BP – 537 BP
- Islamic calendar: 555 BH – 554 BH
- Javanese calendar: N/A
- Julian calendar: AD 84; LXXXIV
- Korean calendar: 2417
- Minguo calendar: 1828 before ROC 民前1828年
- Nanakshahi calendar: −1384
- Seleucid era: 395/396 AG
- Thai solar calendar: 626–627
- Tibetan calendar: ཆུ་མོ་ལུག་ལོ་ (female Water-Sheep); 210 or −171 or −943 — to — ཤིང་ཕོ་སྤྲེ་ལོ་ (male Wood-Monkey); 211 or −170 or −942

AD 84 (LXXXIV) was a leap year starting on Thursday of the Julian calendar. In the Roman Empire, it was known as the Year of the Consulship of Augustus and Sabinus (or, less frequently, year 837 Ab urbe condita). The denomination AD 84 for this year has been used since the early medieval period, when the Anno Domini calendar era became the prevalent method in Europe for naming years.

== Events ==
=== By place ===
==== Roman Empire ====
- Possible date of the Battle of Mons Graupius (AD 83 or 84), in which Gnaeus Julius Agricola defeats the Caledonians.
- Emperor Domitian recalls Agricola back to Rome, where he is rewarded with a triumph and the governorship of the Roman province of Africa, but he declines it.
- Pliny the Younger is sevir equitum Romanorum (commander of a cavalry squadron).
- The construction of the limes, a line of Roman fortifications from the Rhine to the Danube, has begun.
- Through his election as consul for ten years and censor for life, Domitian openly subordinates the republican aspect of the state to the monarchical.
- Domitian increases the troops' pay by one third, thus securing their loyalty.

==== Asia ====
- Change from Jianchu to Yuanhe era of the Chinese Eastern Han dynasty.

== Deaths ==
- Luke the Evangelist, Greek physician and martyr
- Titus Flavius Sabinus, Roman consul married Julia Flavia (executed)
