= Igor Arkhipov =

Russian politician (born 1953)

Igor Arkhipov (born November 17, 1953, in Saratov) is a Russian politician and member of the State Duma of the Russian Federation.

== State Duma Deputy ==
On September 23, 2010, he received a mandate as a deputy of the State Duma, filling the seat vacated after Yuri Zelensky returned to his previous position as Head of the Main Directorate of the Central Bank of the Russian Federation for the Saratov Region.

== See also ==
- Politics of Russia
