= Diogenes of Byzantium =

Bishop of Byzantium from 114 to 129

- Bishop of Byzantium
- Installed: 114
- Term ended: 129
- Predecessor: Sedecion of Byzantium
- Successor: Eleutherius of Byzantium

Personal details
- Died: 129
- Denomination: Early Christianity

Diogenes of Byzantium (Greek: Διογένης; died c. 129) was the bishop of Byzantium for approximately fifteen years (114–129). He succeeded bishop Sedecion of Byzantium. He was in office during the rule of Roman emperors Trajan and Hadrian. Very little is known of him

== Notes and references ==
Titles of the Great Christian Church
Preceded by Sedecion	Bishop of Byzantium; 114 – 129	Succeeded by Eleutherius
