= Polycarpus I of Byzantium =

Bishop of Byzantium from 69 to 89 AD

- Bishop of Byzantium
- Installed: 69 AD
- Term ended: 89 AD
- Predecessor: Onesimus of Byzantium
- Successor: Plutarch of Byzantium

Personal details
- Died: 89 AD
- Denomination: Early Christianity

Polycarpus I of Byzantium (Greek: Πολύκαρπος) was a bishop of Byzantium. He succeeded bishop Onesimus of Byzantium in 69 AD, and served in that office until his death in 89 AD. His last eight years of office (from 81 AD) were during Roman emperor Domitian's persecution of the Christians. His relics are deposited in the church of Argyropouli.

== Notes and references ==
Religious titles
Preceded by Onesimus	Bishop of Byzantium; 69 – 89	Succeeded by Plutarch
