= Sedecion of Byzantium =

Bishop of Byzantium from 105 to 114

- Bishop of Byzantium
- Installed: 105
- Term ended: 114
- Predecessor: Plutarch of Byzantium
- Successor: Diogenes of Byzantium

Personal details
- Died: 114
- Denomination: Early Christianity

Sedecion of Byzantium (Greek: Σεδεκίων; died 114) was a bishop of Byzantium. He succeeded bishop Plutarch of Byzantium in 105, and served in that office for nine years until 114. He was in office during Roman emperor Trajan's persecution of the Christians.

== Notes and references ==
Titles of the Great Christian Church
Preceded by Plutarch	Bishop of Byzantium; 105 – 114	Succeeded by Diogenes
