= Plutarch of Byzantium =

Bishop of Byzantium from 89 to 105

- Bishop of Byzantium
- Installed: 89 AD
- Term ended: 105
- Predecessor: Polycarpus I of Byzantium
- Successor: Sedecion of Byzantium

Personal details
- Died: 105
- Denomination: Early Christianity

Plutarch of Byzantium (Ancient Greek: Πλούταρχος; died 105) served as Bishop of Byzantium for sixteen years (89 – 105) in succession to Polycarpus I of Byzantium. When he died, he was buried in the church of Argyroupoli, as were his predecessors.

The persecution of Christians by Roman emperor Trajan took place in 98, during the bishopric of Plutarch.

== Bibliography ==
- List of Patriarchs on the official website of the Ecumenical Patriarchate.

Titles of the Great Christian Church
Preceded by Polycarpus I	Bishop of Byzantium; 89 – 105	Succeeded by Sedecion
