= Gaius Vettulenus Civica Cerealis =

1st century Roman senator and governor

Gaius Vettulenus Civica Cerealis (died 88) was a Roman senator who held at least one office in the service of the emperor. He was appointed suffect consul some time between 73 and 76.

Civica Cerealis was of Sabine origin. Ronald Syme speculates that the Sextus Vettulenus Cerealis, memorialized with his wife Lusia Galla in an inscription recovered at Venafro, was Cerealis' father and mother. If that is the case, his father served as a soldier, and his career was capped as primus pilus of Legio XI.

Following his tenure as suffect consul, Cerealis was appointed governor of the imperial province of Moesia from 81 to 84. The sortition allotted him the prestigious public province of Asia for 87/88. During his time in this office, he was confronted with an uprising led by a false Nero at the time of Domitian's Dacian War, but Cerealis failed to suppress the pretender. It is not known if Cerealis was involved in a conspiracy against the emperor Domitian or if his failure was due to his reluctance to act. In either case, Cerealis was arrested and executed on Domitian's orders.
