= Lucius Antonius Saturninus =

1st-century AD Roman governor, general and usurper

- Died: 89 AD; Mainz
- Military career
- Allegiance: Roman Empire
- Service years: 76 AD–89 AD
- Rank: General
- Commands: Legio XXI Rapax; Legio XIV Gemina
- Other work: Roman Consul in 82 AD

Lucius Antonius Saturninus was a Roman senator and general during the reign of Vespasian and his sons. While governor of the province called Germania Superior, motivated by a personal grudge against Emperor Domitian, he led a rebellion known as the Revolt of Saturninus, involving the legions Legio XIV Gemina and Legio XXI Rapax, camped in Moguntiacum (Mainz).

== Life ==
Saturninus was subjected to a damnatio memoriae following his defeat and death, and his systematic obliteration from public records makes it difficult to reconstruct his life before his revolt. Ronald Syme has offered a possible cursus honorum for Saturninus, based on inscriptions with erasures of the relevant dates. The earliest is a proconsular governorship in Macedonia, dated to about 76, then a possible governorship in Judea from possibly 78 to 81; the governorship of Judea was paired with command of Legio X Fretensis. First proposed by Bartolomeo Borghesi, but later accepted by Syme and others, was a nundinium as suffect consul in either 82 or 83. In 87 he was governor of Germania Superior.

== Revolt of Saturninus ==
In January 89, Saturninus led a revolt. He expected his Germanic allies to cross the Rhine to support him, but this was thwarted by a sudden thaw of the river ice, and the revolt was quickly put down by Domitian's generals Aulus Lappius Maximus Norbanus and the future emperor Trajan. Afterwards, Norbanus burned Saturninus' letters in an attempt to avoid implicating others. However, Domitian had numerous others executed with Saturninus, displaying their heads on the rostra at Rome. The Legio XXI was sent to Pannonia, and Domitian passed a law prohibiting two legions from sharing the same camp.

== See also ==
- List of Roman usurpers
