= Archippus =

Person mentioned in the New Testament

Saint Archippus
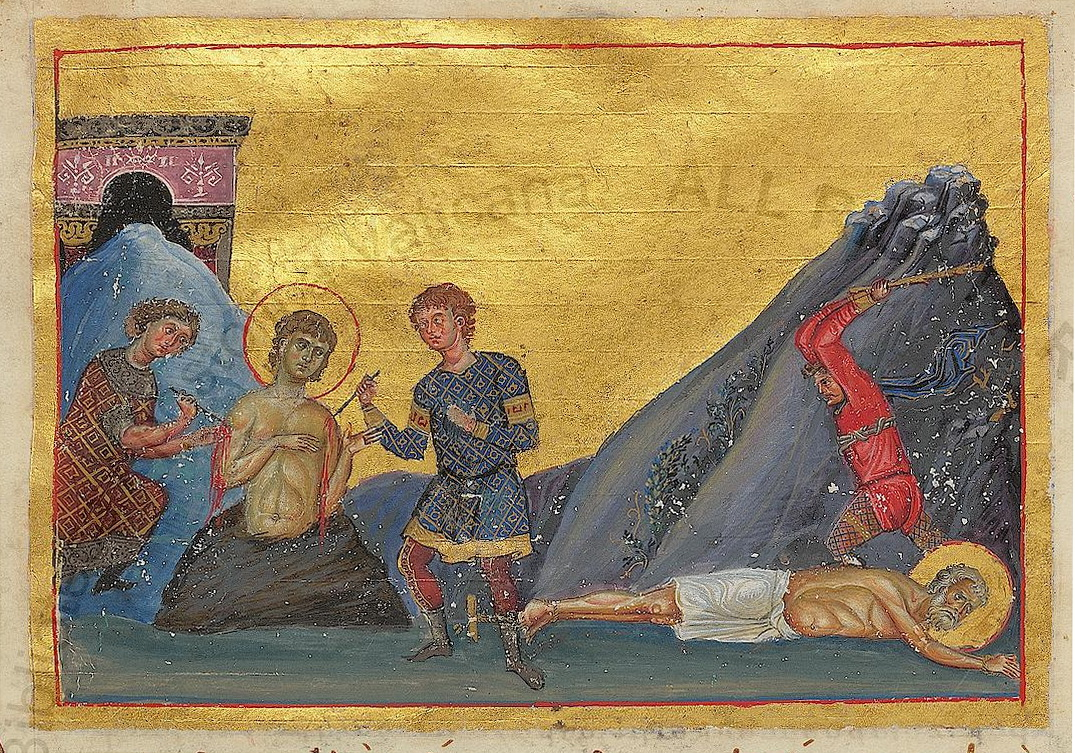
- Archippus as depicted in the Menologion of Basil II

Martyr
- Born: possibly Colossae, Asia, Roman Empire or Laodicea, Asia, Roman Empire
- Died: c. 1st century
- Venerated in: Eastern Orthodox Church; Roman Catholic Church
- Feast: 19 February (Eastern Orthodox Church); 20 March (Roman Catholic Church)

Archippus (/ɑːrˈkɪpəs/; Ancient Greek: Ἄρχιππος, "master of the horse") was an early Christian believer mentioned briefly in the New Testament epistles of Philemon and Colossians.

== Role in the New Testament ==
In Paul's letter to Philemon (Philemon 1:2), Archippus is named once alongside Philemon and Apphia as a host of the church, and a "fellow soldier." In Colossians 4:17 (ascribed to Paul), the church is instructed to tell Archippus to "Take heed to the ministry which thou hast received in the Lord, that thou fulfil it."

== Role in tradition ==
According to the 4th century Apostolic Constitutions (7.46), Archippus was the first bishop of Laodicea in Phrygia (now part of Turkey). Another tradition states that he was one of the 72 disciples appointed by Jesus Christ in Luke 10:1. The Roman Catholic Church observes a feast day for Saint Archippus on March 20. According to tradition, he was stoned to death.

== Veneration ==
=== Eastern Orthodoxy ===
The Eastern Orthodox Church commemorates Archippus on several days.

- January 4: Synaxis of the Seventy Apostles.
- February 19: The apostles Archippus and Philemon, and the martyr Apphia.
- November 22: The apostles Philemon and Archippus, the martyr Apphia, and Onesimus.

== See also ==
- Colossians 4
