= Phyllis =

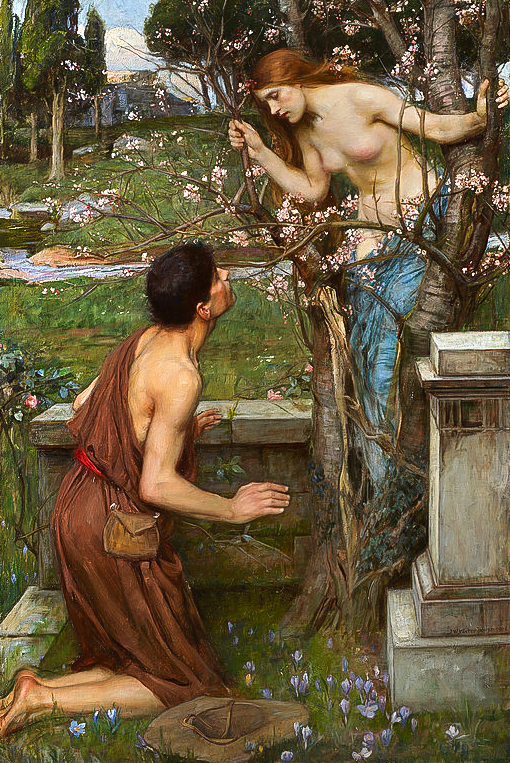
- Phyllis and Demophon by John William Waterhouse.
- Gender: Female
- Language: Greek

Origin
- Meaning: foliage

Other names
- Related names: Filiz, Philis, Phillida, Phillis, Phyliss, Phyllicia, Phyllida

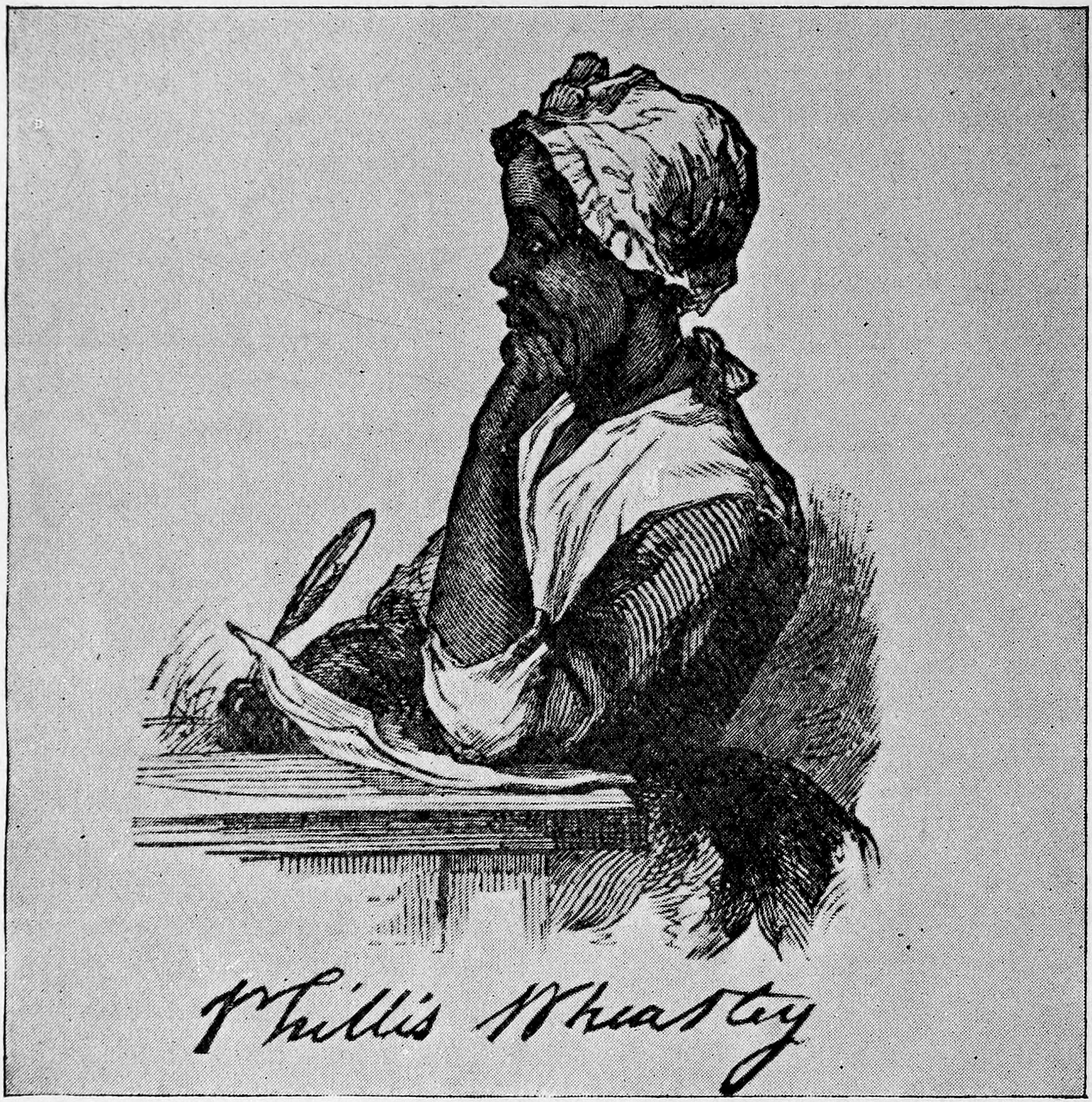
Phillis Wheatley (1753–1784), African-born American poet.

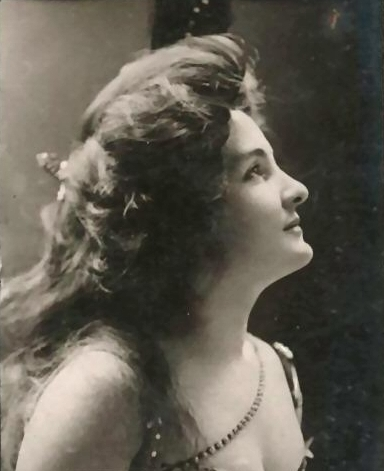
American actress Phyllis Rankin (1874–1934).

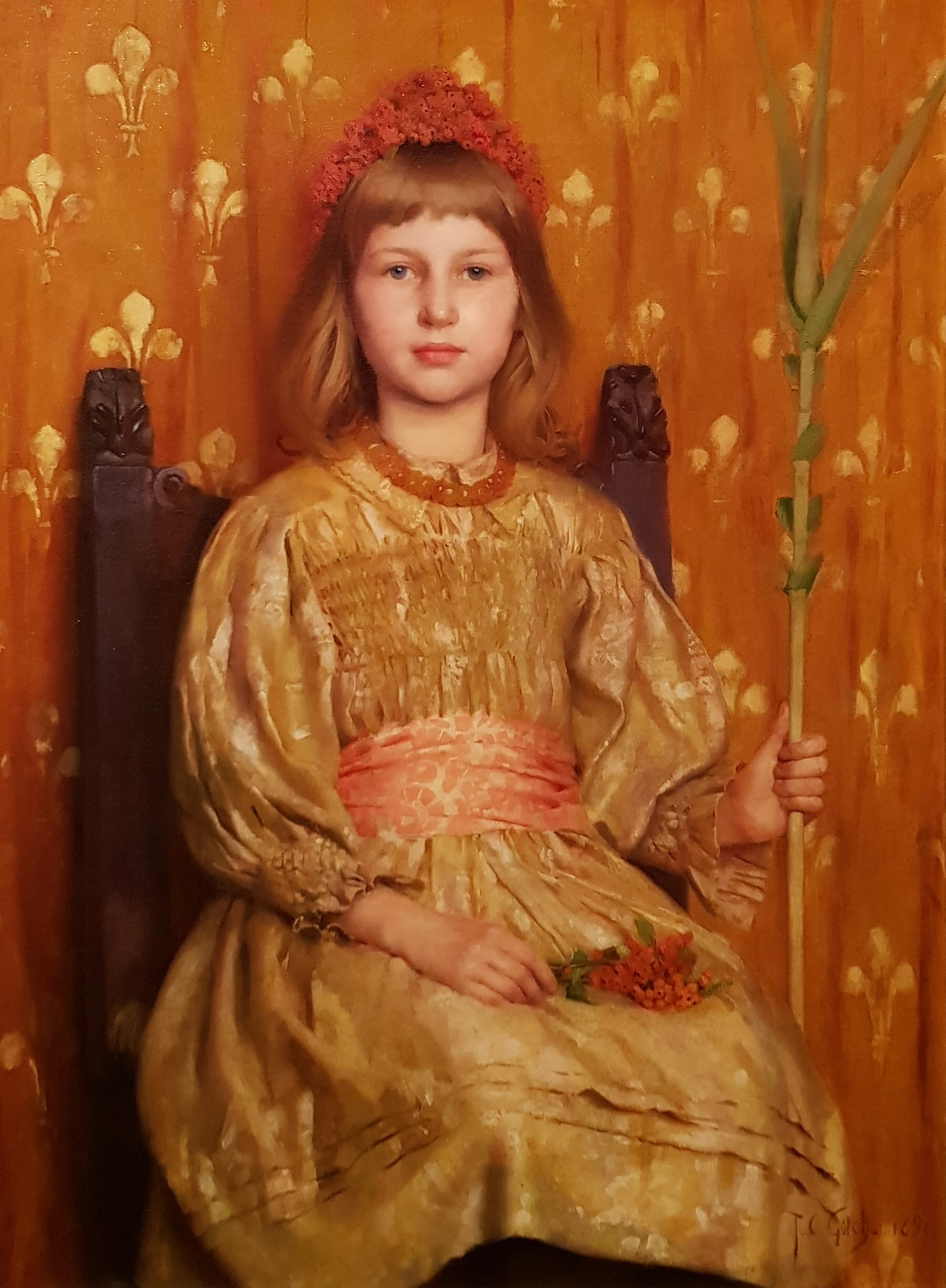
Phyllis Marion Gotch (1882–1963), posed for the 1892 portrait entitled My Crown and Sceptor by her father Thomas Cooper Gotch.

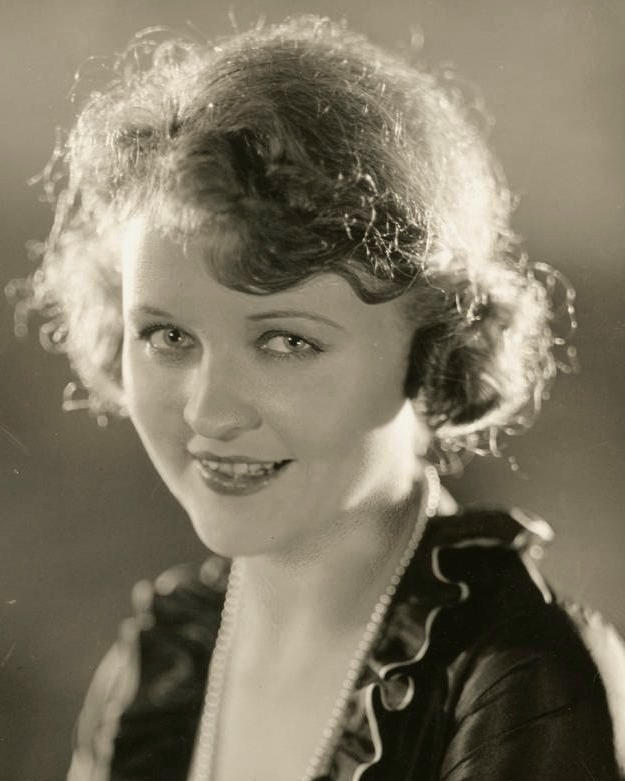
American actress Phyllis Haver (1899–1960) in 1922.

South African Rhodesian Ridgeback breeder Phyllis McCarthy (1903–1986).

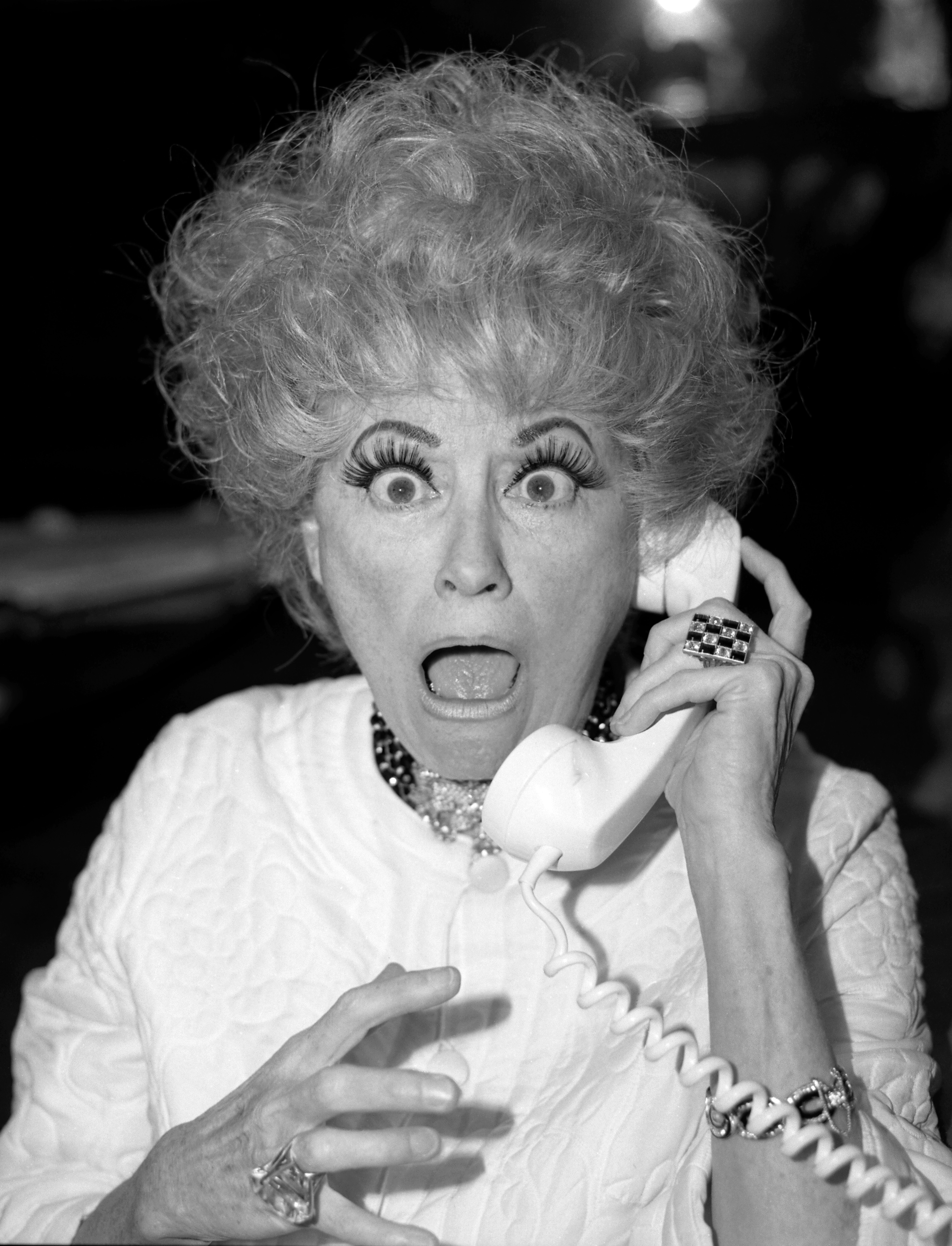
American comedian Phyllis Diller (1917–2012).

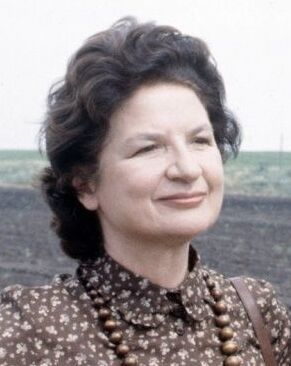
British mystery novelist P.D. James (1920–2014) pictured in 1984.

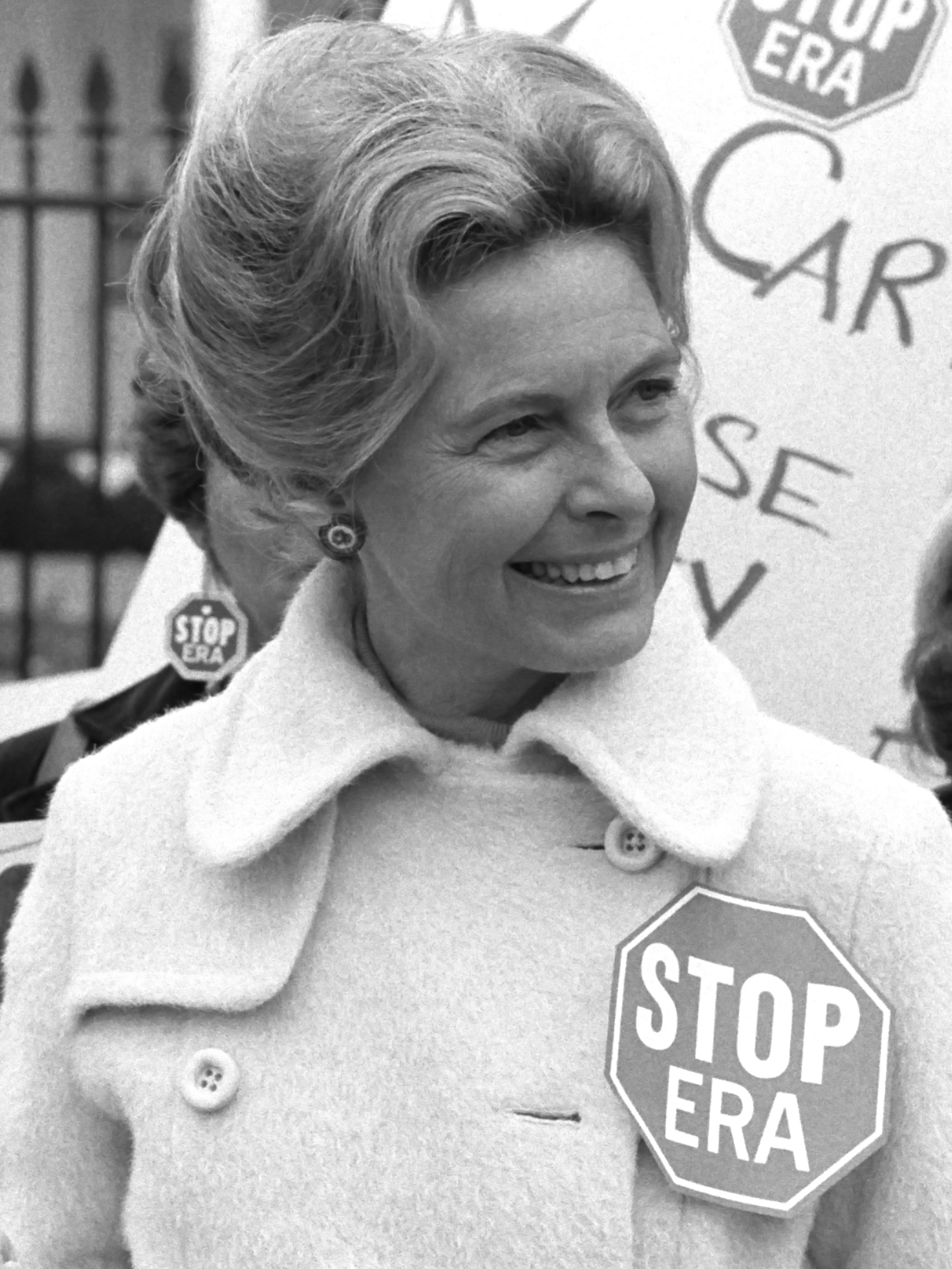
American conservative activist and lawyer Phyllis Schlafly (1924–2016), pictured in 1977.

Phyllis or Phillis is a feminine given name of Greek origin meaning foliage. Phyllis is a minor figure in Greek mythology who killed herself in despair when Demophon of Athens did not return to her and who was transformed into an almond tree by the gods. Phillida, Phyllicia, and Phyllida are all variants of the name.

== Usage ==
The name has been in modern use since the 17th century when, often spelled Phillis, it was used by English poets John Wilmot, 2nd Earl of Rochester, and Matthew Prior, probably taken from the supposed mistress of Aristotle, or other classical examples. The African-born American poet Phillis Wheatley (1753–1784), who was captured and enslaved in the United States and was later freed, was named Phillis by her enslavers after the slave ship on which she arrived. Phillis was a popular name for women among enslaved women in the United States. In the spelling Phyllis, the name was popularized in the late 1800s after it was used by bestselling popular Irish novelist Margaret Wolfe Hungerford for the heroine of her 1877 romantic novel Phyllis, the Duchess. The name Phyllis was among the top 1,000 names for newborn girls in the United States in 1880 and increased in use in the late 19th century and early 20th century. The popularity of American actress Phyllis Haver (1899–1960) also raised the profile of the name. Phyllis was among the top 100 names for American girls by 1915 and peaked in popularity in 1929 as the 24th most popular name for American girls. It remained among the top 1,000 names for American girls until 1950 and then declined in use.

The name was also at its most popular in the Anglosphere, in countries such as Australia, Canada, New Zealand, and the United Kingdom, in the first part of the 20th century.

== Mythological and legendary characters ==
- The title character of the tale of Phyllis and Aristotle in medieval legend
- Phyllis, wife of Demophon, king of Athens
- Phyllis (river god)
- Phyllis, consort of Ereuthalion
- Phyllis, mother of the Trojan Alcaeus

== Women ==
- Phyllis Ackerman (1893–1977), American art historian, interior designer and author
- Phyllis B. Acosta (1933–2018), American public health researcher
- Phyllis Adams (born c. 1964 or 1965), American soprano vocalist and flight attendant
- Phyllis Allen (1861–1938), American vaudeville and silent screen comedian
- Phyllis Shand Allfrey (1908–1986), West Indian writer, socialist activist, newspaper editor, and politician
- Phyllis Arkle (1910–1997), English author of children's books
- Phyllis Margery Anderson (1901–1957), Australian pathologist
- Phyllis Aronoff, Canadian literary translator
- Phyllis Avery (1922–2011), American actress
- Phyllis A. Balch (1930–2004), American nutritionist and author
- Phyllis Baldino (born 1956), American visual artist
- Phyllis Barber (born 1943), American writer
- Phyllis Bardeau (1934–2023), American Seneca author, educator, and lexicographer
- Phyllis Barnhart (1922–2008), American animator and cel painter
- Phyllis Barry (1908–1954), English film actress
- Phyllis Bartholomew (1914–2002), English long jumper
- Phyllis Battelle (1922–2005), American journalist
- Phyllis Bedells (1893-–1985), British ballerina and dance teacher
- Phyllis Bennis (born 1951), American Jewish writer, activist, and political commentator
- Phyllis Bentley (1894–1977), English novelist
- Phyllis Berman (born 1942), American co-founder of the Riverside Language Program in New York City
- Phyllis Drummond Bethune (1899–1982), New Zealand artist
- Phyllis Bird (born 1934), American feminist scholar in biblical hermeneutics
- Phyllis Birkby (1932–1994), American architect
- Phyllis Blackwell (born 1957), American professional tennis player
- Phyllis Blakeley (1922–1986), Canadian historian, biographer and archivist
- Phyllis Blythe (1912–2001), British actress known as Jenny Laird
- Phyllis Pray Bober (1920–2002), American art historian, scholar, and author
- Phyllis Bolds (1932–2018), American physicist
- Phyllis Bone (1894–1972), Scottish sculptor
- Phyllis Bookout (1935–1964), American baseball player
- Phyllis Borzi, American government official
- Phyllis Bottome (1884–1963), British novelist and short story writer
- Phyllis Boyens (1947–2009), American folk singer and actress
- Phyllis Bramson (born 1941), American artist
- Phyllis Brooks (1915–1995), American actress and model
- Phyllis Calvert (1915–2002), British actress
- Phyllis Campbell (1894–?), Australian-born World War I nurse and writer
- Phyllis Cook Carlisle (1912–1954), Canadian architect
- Phyllis Carlson, American baseball player
- Phyllis Chan (born 1991), Canadian badminton player
- Phyllis Chase (c. 1897–c. 1977), English illustrator
- Phyllis Chemutai (born 1962), Ugandan politician
- Phyllis Chen (born 1978), American composer, sound artist, and pianist
- Phyllis Chesler (born 1940), American writer, psychotherapist, and professor
- Phyllis M. Christian (born 1956), Ghanaian lawyer and consultant
- Phyllis Cilento (1894–1987), Australian doctor and medical journalist
- Phyllis Clare (1905–1947), British actress
- Phyllis Cleveland, American politician
- Phyllis Coard (1943–2020), Jamaican-Grenadian revolutionary and politician
- Phyllis Coates, stage name of American actress Gypsie Ann Evarts Stell (born 1927)
- Phyllis Covell (1895–1982), British tennis player
- Phyllis Crane (1914–1982), Canadian-born American film actress
- Phyllis Mae Dailey (1919–1976), first African American woman United States Navy nurse and officer
- Phyllis Dalton (1925–2025), British costume designer
- Phyllis Danaher (1908–1991), Australian dancer, teacher of dance and choreographer
- Phyllis Dare (1890–1975), English actress and singer
- Phyllis Davis (1940–2013), American actress
- Phyllis Worthy Dawkins (born 1953), American academic administrator
- Phyllis Dawson (born 1957), American Olympic equestrian
- Phyllis Dewar (1916–1961), Canadian Olympic swimmer
- Phyllis Diller (1917–2012), American actress/comedian
- Phyllis Dillon (1944–2004), Jamaican rocksteady and reggae singer
- Phyllis Dixey (1914–1964), English singer, actress, dancer, and impresario
- Phyllis Draper (1907–2000), American paleoecologist
- Phyllis Duganne (1899–1976), American writer
- Phyllis Duguid (1904–1993), Australian teacher and Aboriginal rights and women's activist
- Phyllis Edness (1930–before 2007), Bermudian Olympic sprinter
- Phyllis Eisenstein (1946–2020), American writer
- Phyllis Ellis (born 1959), Canadian hockey player, actor, and director
- Phyllis M. Faber (1928–2023), American environmental activist and agriculture botanist
- Phyllis Faria (1924–2018), Indian politician
- Phyllis Fox (1923–2017), American mathematician, electrical engineer and computer scientist
- Phyllis Francis (born 1992), American track and field athlete
- Phyllis Fraser, stage name of American socialite, writer, publisher, and actress Helen Brown Nichols (1916–2006)
- Phyllis Frelich (1944–2014), American Deaf actress
- Phyllis Friend (1922–2013), British nurse and nursing officer
- Phyllis Frost (1917–2004), Australian welfare worker and philanthropist
- Phyllis Frye (born 1948), American judge
- Phyllis Gardner (British writer) (1890–1939), British writer, artist, and noted breeder of Irish Wolfhounds
- Phyllis Gardner (clinical pharmacologist) (born 1950), American physician and professor
- Phyllis Gates (1925–2006), American secretary and interior decorator, former wife of actor Rock Hudson
- Phyllis George (1949–2020), American businesswoman, actress, and sportscaster
- Phyllis Gilmore (1945–2021), American politician
- Phyllis Ginger (1907–2005), British artist and illustrator
- Phyllis Goodhart Gordan (1913–1994), American scholar, collector, and philanthropist
- Phyllis Gordon (1889–1964), American actress
- Phyllis Marion Gotch (1882–1963), British artist model, singer, author, and community activist
- Phyllis Gotlieb (1926–2009), Canadian writer
- Phyllis E. Grann (born 1937), American publisher and editor
- Phyllis Green, American artist and educator
- Phyllis Greenacre (1894–1989), American psychoanalyst and physician
- Phyllis Grosskurth (1924–2015), Canadian academic, writer, and literary critic
- Phyllis Guthardt (1929–2023), New Zealand Methodist minister and women's leader
- Phyllis Haislip (born 1944), American author and historian
- Phyllis J. Hamilton (born 1952), American judge
- Phyllis Harding (1907–1992), British Olympic swimmer
- Phyllis Harmon (1916–2016), American bicycle enthusiast
- Phyllis Hartnoll (1906–1997), British poet, author and editor
- Phyllis Haslam (1913–1991), Indian-Canadian swimmer and social worker
- Phyllis Haver (1899–1960), American actress
- Phyllis Hetzel (1918–2011), British civil servant and university administrator
- Phyllis Hill (1920–1993), American dancer and actress
- Phyllis Gomda Hsi (1938–2023), Taiwanese vocalist and music educator
- Phyllis Hyman (1949–1995), American jazz singer
- Phylis Lee Isley, birth name of Jennifer Jones (1919–2009), American film actress
- Phyllis Jacobson (1922–2010), American socialist
- P. D. James (1920–2014), English crime fiction writer
- Phylis Jepkemoi, Kenyan politician
- Phyllis Joffe (c. 1943 or 1944–2002), American radio and television producer, journalist, and educator
- Phyllis Johnson (1886–1967), British Olympic figure skater
- Phyllis T. Johnson (born 1926), American parasitologist, virologist, and marine biologist
- Phyllis Kaberry (1910–1977), Australian anthropologist
- Phyllis Kahn (born 1937), American politician
- Phyllis Ann Karr (born 1944), American author
- Phyllis Kennedy (1914–1998), American film actress
- Phyllis Gutiérrez Kenney (1936–2025), American politician
- Phyllis Kernick (1924–2009), American politician
- Phyllis Margaret Tookey Kerridge (1901–1940), British chemist and physiologist
- Phyllis Kind (1933–2018), American art dealer
- Phyllis Kipp (died 1984), American politician
- Phyllis Mudford King (1905–2006), English tennis player
- Phyllis King, British poet and children's author
- Phyllis Kirk (1927–2006), American actress
- Phyllis Konstam (1907–1976), English film actress
- Phyllis Krasilovsky (1926–2014), American writer of children's books
- Phyllis A. Kravitch (1920–2017), American judge
- Phyllis Kyomuhendo, Ugandan entrepreneur
- Phyllis La Fond, American singer
- Phyllis Lambert (born 1927), Canadian architect and philanthropist
- Phyllis Lamphere (1922–2018), American politician and civic activist
- Phyllis Latour (1921–2023), South African-born agent of the British Special Operations Executive in France during the Second World War
- Phyllis Louise Lawrence (1868–1912), British philanthropist
- Phyllis Lightbourn-Jones (born 1928), Bermudian Olympic sprinter and long jumper
- Phyllis Litoff (1938–2002), American singer, jazz impresario, and artistic director
- Phyllis Logan (born 1956), Scottish actress
- Phyllis Love (1925–2011), American actress
- Phyllis Lyon (1924–2020), American lesbian rights activist
- Phyllis Stadler Lyon, American former field hockey player
- Phyllis Marshall (1921–1996), Canadian singer and actress
- Phyllis Matthewman (1896–1979), British writer of children's books
- Phyllis McAlpine (1941–1998), Canadian geneticist
- Phyllis McCarthy (1903–1986), South African breeder of and authority on Rhodesian Ridgeback dogs
- Phyllis McDonagh (1900–1978), Australian film producer, production designer, and journalist
- Phyllis McGinley (1905–1978), American author
- Phyllis McGuire (1931–2020), American singer
- Phyllis McKie, Canadian historian and photographer
- Phyllis W. McQuaid (1928–2023), American politician
- Phyllis Moen (born 1942), American sociologist
- Phyllis Morris (actress) (1894–1982), English dramatist, children's writer and actress
- Phyllis Morris (furniture designer) (1925–1988), American furniture designer
- Phyllis Morse (born 1934), American archaeologist
- Phyllis Digby Morton (1901–1984), British fashion journalist and editor
- Phyllis Munday (1894–1990), Canadian mountaineer, explorer, naturalist and humanitarian
- Phyllis Murphy (1924–2025), Australian architect
- Phyllis Nagy (born 1962), American screenwriter/director
- Phyllis Reynolds Naylor (born 1933), American writer
- Phyllis Ndlovu (died 2022), Zimbabwean politician
- Phyllis Neilson-Terry (1892–1977), English actress
- Phyllis Nelson (1950–1998), American singer
- Phyllis Newman (1933–2019), American actress
- Phyllis Nicol (1908–1999), British athlete
- Phyllis Mary Nicol (1903–1964), Australian physics professor
- Phyllis Nicolson (1917–1968), British mathematician and physicist
- Phyllis Ntantala-Jordan (1920–2016), South African political activist and author
- Phyllis E. Oakley (1934–2022), American diplomat
- Phyllis O'Donnell (1937–2024), Australian surfer
- Phyllis Omido (born c. 1978), Kenyan environmentalist
- Phyll Opoku-Gyimah (born 1974), British political activist
- Phyllis Osei, Ghanaian police officer
- Phyllis Paul (1903–1973), English novelist
- Phyllis Pearsall (1906–1996), British creator of the A to Z map of London
- Phyllis Piddington (1910–2001), Australian writer
- Phyllis Tilson Piotrow (born 1933), American academic
- Phyllis Povah (1893–1975), American actress
- Phyllis Quek (born 1972), Malaysian-based Singaporean actress
- Phyllis Randall (born c. 1964 or 1965), American politician and mental-health therapist
- Phyllis Rankin (1874–1934), American actress and singer
- Phyllis Rappeport (1929–2020), American pianist, teacher, and chamber musician
- Phyllis Reeve (born 1938), Fijian born Canadian librarian and marina operator
- Phyllis Richmond (1921–1997), American librarian and historian of science
- Phyllis Roberts (1916–?), British sculptor and painter
- Phyllis Rose (born 1942), American literary critic, essayist, biographer, and educator
- Phyllis Rountree (1911–1994), Australian microbiologist and bacteriologist
- Phyllis Rutledge (1932–2015), American politician
- Phyllis Ryan (1895–1983), Irish chemist and nationalist, the second wife of President of Ireland Seán T. O'Kelly
- Phyllis Satterthwaite (1886–1962), British tennis player
- Phyllis Schlafly (1924–2016), American writer and conservative activist
- Phyllis Schneck, American executive and cybersecurity professional
- Phyllis Schneider, Canadian developmental psycholinguist
- Phyllis Sellick (1911–2007), British pianist and teacher
- Phyllis Shannaw (1901–1988), English actress
- Phyllis Sheffield (1916–2015), American photographer
- Phyllis Sinclair, Canadian Cree folk singer-songwriter
- Phyllis Sjöström (1888–1964), British-born opera singer
- Phyllis Smith (born 1949), American actress and casting director
- Phyllis Somerville (1943–2020), American actress
- Phyllis A. Spiegel, American Episcopal bishop
- Phyllis Spira (1943–2008), South African ballet dancer
- Phyllis Stabeno, American physical oceanographer
- Phyllis Stanley (1914–1992), British actress
- Phyllis Stern (1925–2014), American registered nurse, college professor and nursing theorist
- Phyllis Yvonne Stickney (born 1957), American actress and comedian
- Phyllis Taloikwai, senior government official in the Solomon Islands
- Phyllis Tate (1911–1987), English composer
- Phyllis Terrell (1898–1989), American suffragist and civil rights activist
- Phyllis Thaxter (1919–2012), American actress
- Phyllis D. Thompson (born 1952), American judge
- Phyllis Treigle (born 1960), American soprano
- Phyllis Trible (born 1932), American feminist biblical scholar
- Phyllis Tuchman (born 1947), American art historian, critic and author
- Phyllis Wallbank (1918–2020), British educationalist
- Phyllis Webb (1927–2021), Canadian poet and broadcaster
- Phyllis Webstad (born 1967), Canadian author and activist
- Phyllis Weliver, American academic
- Phillis Wheatley (1753–1784), first African-American published poet
- Phyllis A. Whitney (1903–2008), American mystery writer
- Phyllis Williams (1905–1993), New Zealand singer and horsewoman
- Phyllis J. Wilson, American military officer
- Phyllis Wise, American biomedical researcher and academic
- Phyllis Wylie (1911–2012), English amateur golfer
- Phyllis Yaffe (born 1949), Canadian politician and media executive
- Phyllis Brett Young (1914–1996), Canadian novelist
- Phyllis Young American Lakota/Dakota activist
- Phyllis Zagano (born 1947), American author and academic
- Phyllis Zee, American neurologist
- Phyllis Zimmerman (1934–2012), American composer, choral conductor, and music educator
- Phyllis Zouzounis, American winemaker

== Fictional characters ==
- Phyllis Dietrichson, in James Cain's novella Double Indemnity and two film adaptations
- Phyllis Lindstrom, on The Mary Tyler Moore Show and Phyllis, a 1970s TV spin-off, played by Cloris Leachman.
- Phyllis Nefler, the protagonist of Troop Beverly Hills played by Shelley Long
- Phyllis Painter, a supporting character in Alan Moore's 2016 novel Jerusalem.
- Phyllis Pearce, a character from the British soap opera Coronation Street, played by Jill Summers.
- Phyllis Potter, a character in the 1990 film Quick Change played by Geena Davis.
- Phyllis Summers Newman, on The Young and the Restless
- Phyllis Vance (née Lapin), on The Office played by Phyllis Smith.
- Phyllis (Passions), a minor character on Passions
