= Phyllis (disambiguation) =

Phyllis is a feminine given name.

Phyllis may also refer to:

== Places ==
- Phyllis Township, Ontario, Canada
- Phyllis Province, Greece
- Phyllis, Kentucky, United States, an unincorporated community
- Phyllis Lake, Idaho, United States
- Phyllis Bay, Montagu Island, part of the South Sandwich Islands
- 556 Phyllis, an asteroid

== Transportation ==
- Phyllis (ship), a British ship that was shipwrecked in 1795
- Fiat Phyllis, a prototype fuel cell-type hydrogen vehicle
- Phyllis, a LCDR Acis class steam locomotive

== Other uses ==
- Phyllis (TV series), a 1970s American sitcom
- Typhoon Phyllis (disambiguation)
- Phyllis (plant), a genus of plants in the family Rubiaceae

== See also ==
- Phillis
