= Karl Pillemer =

American sociologist and gerontologist (born 1954)

- Born: October 15, 1954 (age 72); Cleveland, Ohio, United States
- Education: Boston University; Brandeis University
- Known for: Research in gerontology, founder of The Legacy Project
- Spouse: Clare McMillan
- Children: 2
- Scientific career
- Fields: Sociology, gerontology
- Workplaces: University of New Hampshire, Cornell University

Karl Andrew Pillemer (born October 15, 1954) is an American sociologist and gerontologist who is the Hazel E. Reed Professor of Human Development at Cornell University, and Professor of Gerontology in Medicine at Weill Cornell Medicine. His research focuses on intergenerational relations in later life, long-term care for frail and disabled older persons, and social engagement and involvement of older persons. Pillemer is the founder of the Cornell Legacy Project, which since 2004 has collected accounts of the life wisdom of over 2,000 older Americans, and the Cornell Family Reconciliation Project, which researches family estrangement.

== Early life ==
Pillemer was born on October 15, 1954, to Jean Burrell Pillemer and Louis Pillemer, an early pioneer in the field of immunology at Case Western Reserve University. After the death of his father when Pillemer was three years old, his grandmother moved in with the family; Pillemer attributes his close relationship with her as a main source of his eventual career in gerontology.

== Career ==
Pillemer received his B.A. from Boston University in 1977 and received his M.A. from Brandeis University in 1980, followed by his Ph.D. from there in 1985. In his Ph.D. dissertation work he collaborated with Rosalie S. Wolf in one of the earliest large-scale studies of programs to prevent and treat elder abuse and neglect. He moved to the University of New Hampshire in 1985, where he trained with Murray A. Straus and David Finkelhor, directing a large-scale population survey that established initial prevalence rates for the abuse and neglect of older persons. During this time, he carried out a prevalence survey of elder abuse in nursing homes that showed the high extent of this problem. Pillemer also began his career-long program of research on improving care in nursing homes, authoring five books that have been used in the nursing home industry. Pillemer moved to Cornell University in 1990, where he is a full professor. Over the past 25 years at Cornell, he has conducted empirical research and intervention studies in the area of intergenerational relations. A theoretical and empirical focus of his work has been reviving the concept of ambivalence and applying it to parent-child relations in later life.

== The Legacy Project ==
In 2004, Pillemer described becoming discouraged with the degree to which his research focused exclusively on "the problems of older people and older people as problems." Influenced by concerns about growing ageism and age segregation in contemporary society, he began a series of studies designed to tap the practical life wisdom of older people. Over the ensuing decade, he conducted surveys and in-depth interview studies of over 2,000 older Americans, systematically collecting their advice for living in a number of domains, including career, marriage, child-rearing, avoiding regrets, and aging well. These studies form the largest data set ever assembled of the advice of older people, and included a survey of the advice for love and marriage of 700 long-married elders. The research resulted in two popular books: 30 Lessons for Living: Tried and True Advice from the Wisest Americans and 30 Lessons for Loving: Advice from the Wisest Americans on Love, Relationships, and Marriage. Based on this research, Pillemer has worked internationally to promote the role of older people as sources of practical advice and encouraged both individuals and organizations to incorporate elder wisdom into daily life. The Legacy Project has been featured in multiple media.

== The Cornell Family Reconciliation Project ==
Pillemer is the founder of the Cornell Family Reconciliation Project, which conducted the first national survey on family estrangement. Pillemer published a book, Fault Lines: Fractured Families and How to Mend Them, that details the results of this study and includes interviews with hundreds of people who have experienced family estrangement, as well as insights from leading family researchers and therapists. The book combines the advice of family members who have successfully reconciled with insights from social science research to offer a guide to mending families fractured by estrangement.

== Personal life ==
Pillemer is married to Clare McMillan. They have two children, film producer Hannah Pillemer (1981) and neuropsychologist Sarah Pillemer (1987), and three grandchildren, Clare and Thomas (2016), and Mark (2022).

== Bibliography ==
- Pillemer, Karl (2011). 30 Lessons for Living: Tried and True Advice from the Wisest Americans. New York: Penguin/Hudson Street Press. (Translated editions: Germany, Japan, China, Taiwan, South Korea, Turkey, Vietnam, Romania).
- Pillemer, Karl (2015). 30 Lessons for Loving: Advice from the Wisest Americans on Love, Relationships, and Marriage. Penguin/Hudson Street Press.
- Pillemer, Karl, and Kurt Luescher (Eds.) (2004). Intergenerational Ambivalences: New Perspectives on Parent-Child Relations in Later Life. Stamford, CT: Elsevier/JAI Press. Volume 4 in the series Contemporary Perspectives in Family Research.
- Pillemer, Karl, Phyllis Moen, Elaine Wethington, Nina Glasgow (Eds.) (2000). Social Integration in the Second Half of Life. Baltimore, MD: The Johns Hopkins University Press.
- Pillemer, Karl (2020). Fault Lines: Fractured Families and How to Mend Them. Avery.
- Wolf, Rosalie S., and Karl Pillemer (1989). Helping Elderly Victims: The Reality of Elder Abuse. New York: Columbia University Press.
