= Florence Randle =

American photographer

- Born: Florence Stiles; 1890 or 1891
- Died: 1987 (aged 96)
- Occupation: Photographer
- Family: Phyllis Sheffield (niece)

Florence "Flossie" Randle (née Stiles) was a Works Progress Administration photographer who traveled with her teenage niece, Phyllis Sheffield, to photograph Miccosukee in South Florida around 1937. Sheffield worked as a painter and sold the acclaimed documentary photographs they made together.

Jeff Klinkenberg wrote about their work and it has been displayed at the Smithsonian and in Seminole collections, including at the Ah-Tah-Thi-Ki Seminole Indian Museum. Her work is also in the P.K. Yonge Library of Florida History and the collections of the South Florida Archaeology and Ethnography Program at the Florida Museum of Natural History in Gainesville, Florida. Their work is also included in the Phyllis Sheffield Collection at the Department of Anthropology & Genealogy, Seminole Tribe of Florida.

Randle died in 1987 at the age of 96.
