= Ruelas =

Ruelas is a Spanish-language surname, common in Mexico. It may refer to:

- Gabriel Ruelas (born 1970), Mexican professional boxer
- Julio Ruelas (1870–1970), Mexican artist
- Juan de las Roelas (born c. 1559), Spanish painter of the late-Renaissance
- Rafael Ruelas (born 1971), Mexican professional boxer
