= Scarlett Point =

Scarlett Point (58°28′S 26°20′W) is a point forming the west side of Phyllis Bay at the south end of Montagu Island, in the South Sandwich Islands. Charted in 1930 by DI personnel on the Discovery II and named for E.W.A. Scarlett, accountant on the staff of the Discovery Committee.

== See also ==
- Horsburgh Point
