= Phyllis and Aristotle =

Medieval tale of a woman making a fool of an aged philosopher

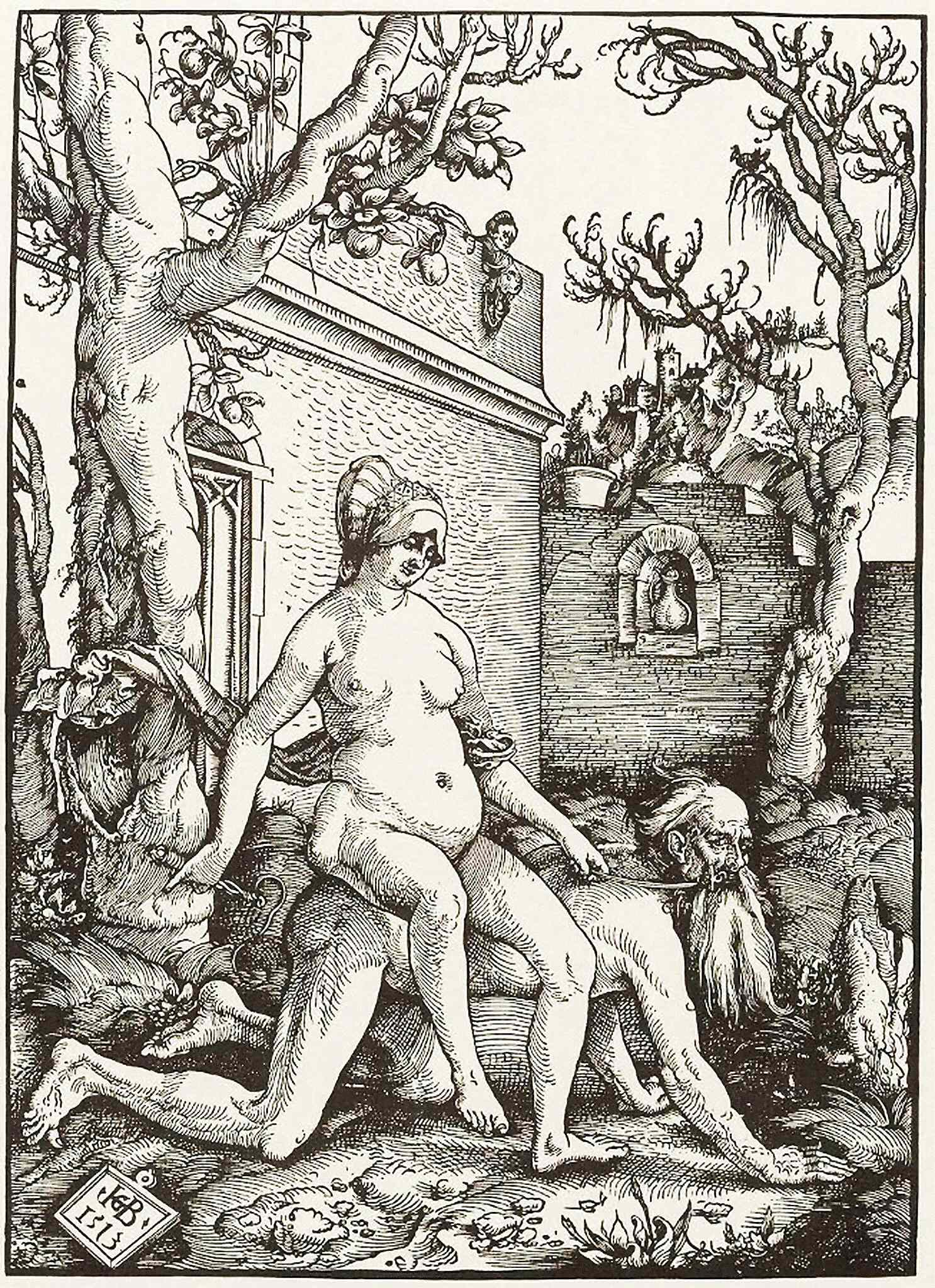
Woodcut of Aristotle ridden by Phyllis by Hans Baldung, 1515

The tale of Phyllis and Aristotle is a medieval cautionary tale about the triumph of a seductive woman, Phyllis, over the greatest male intellect, the ancient Greek philosopher Aristotle. It is one of several stories belonging to the Power of Women artistic and literary topos from that time. Among early versions is the French Lai d'Aristote from 1220.

The story of the dominatrix and the famous intellectual was taken up by artists from the 12th century onwards, in media from stone sculpture in churches to panels of wood or ivory, textiles such as carpets and tapestries, engravings, oil paintings, brass jugs (aquamanile), and stained glass. Artists attracted to the theme include Hans Baldung, Albrecht Dürer, Lucas Cranach the Elder, and Alessandro Turchi.

== Story ==
The tale varies in the telling, but the core of it is as follows: Aristotle advises his pupil Alexander to avoid Phyllis, the seductive mistress of his father, the king, but is himself captivated by her. She agrees to ride him, on condition that she play the role of dominatrix. Phyllis has secretly told Alexander what to expect, and he witnesses Phyllis proving that a woman's charms can overcome even the greatest philosopher's male intellect. Phyllis is also described as Alexander's mistress or possibly wife, rather than his father's.

=== Origins ===
The entirely invented story is said by the Louvre to derive from the German work by Jacques de Vitry in the 13th century. The French work Le Lai d'Aristote (The Lay of Aristotle) is known from manuscripts dating from as early as 1220, attributed by scholars to either Henri d'Andeli or Henri de Valenciennes. (Note: The source of the work was still contested in 2007.)

In 1386, the English poet John Gower included a summary of the tale in his Confessio Amantis (in English, unlike his other major works), a collection of stories of immoral love told in verse. It appears in the poem on Apollonius of Tyre (Book 8, 271–2018), where Gower quips that the philosopher's logic and syllogisms do not save him:

I syh there Aristotle also,
Whom that the queene of Grece so
Hath bridled, that in thilke time
Sche made him such a Silogime,
That he foryat al his logique;
Ther was non art of his Practique,
Thurgh which it mihte ben excluded
That he ne was fully concluded
To love, and dede his obeissance

Also in the 14th century, the Dominican John Herold wrote a Latin version of the story.

In the 15th century, it was featured in the German comedy Ain Spil van Maister Aristotiles (A Play of Master Aristotle).

=== Analysis ===
Comparison of French and German versions
Story element	Lai d'Aristote – French	Aristoteles und Phyllis – German
Alexander	is a victorious king, conqueror of India	is a young man in his father's court
The young woman	is just called "the Indian"	is Phyllis, of noble birth, in the queen's entourage
Situation: Alexander	is lectured by Aristotle for neglecting his duty as head of state and the army	ignores the king's order not to see his lover, as requested by Aristotle for not concentrating on his lessons
The young woman	decides to get revenge on the philosopher	decides to get revenge on the philosopher
The contract: Aristotle	promises he will speak to Alexander on her behalf, in return for her favours	asks her to spend the night with him, in return for money
The seduction scene	takes place in a garden	takes place in a garden
She rides on Aristotle's back	observed by a laughing Alexander	observed by the queen and her retinue, and Phyllis roundly insults Aristotle
In the end, Aristotle	excuses himself to Alexander, saying Amour vainc tot, et tot vaincra tant com li monde durera (Love conquers all, and all shall conquer As long as the world shall last)	flees to a far country, where he meditates on the wickedness of feminine wiles.

== Illustrations ==
=== Medieval ===
The cautionary tale of the dominatrix who made a fool of the famous philosopher became popular across medieval Europe. Medieval sculptors in Maasland created aquamanile, jugs in the form of scenes with human or other figures, depicting Phyllis and Aristotle. The story was depicted in a variety of media including stone, ivory, brass, carpet, tapestry, and engravings.

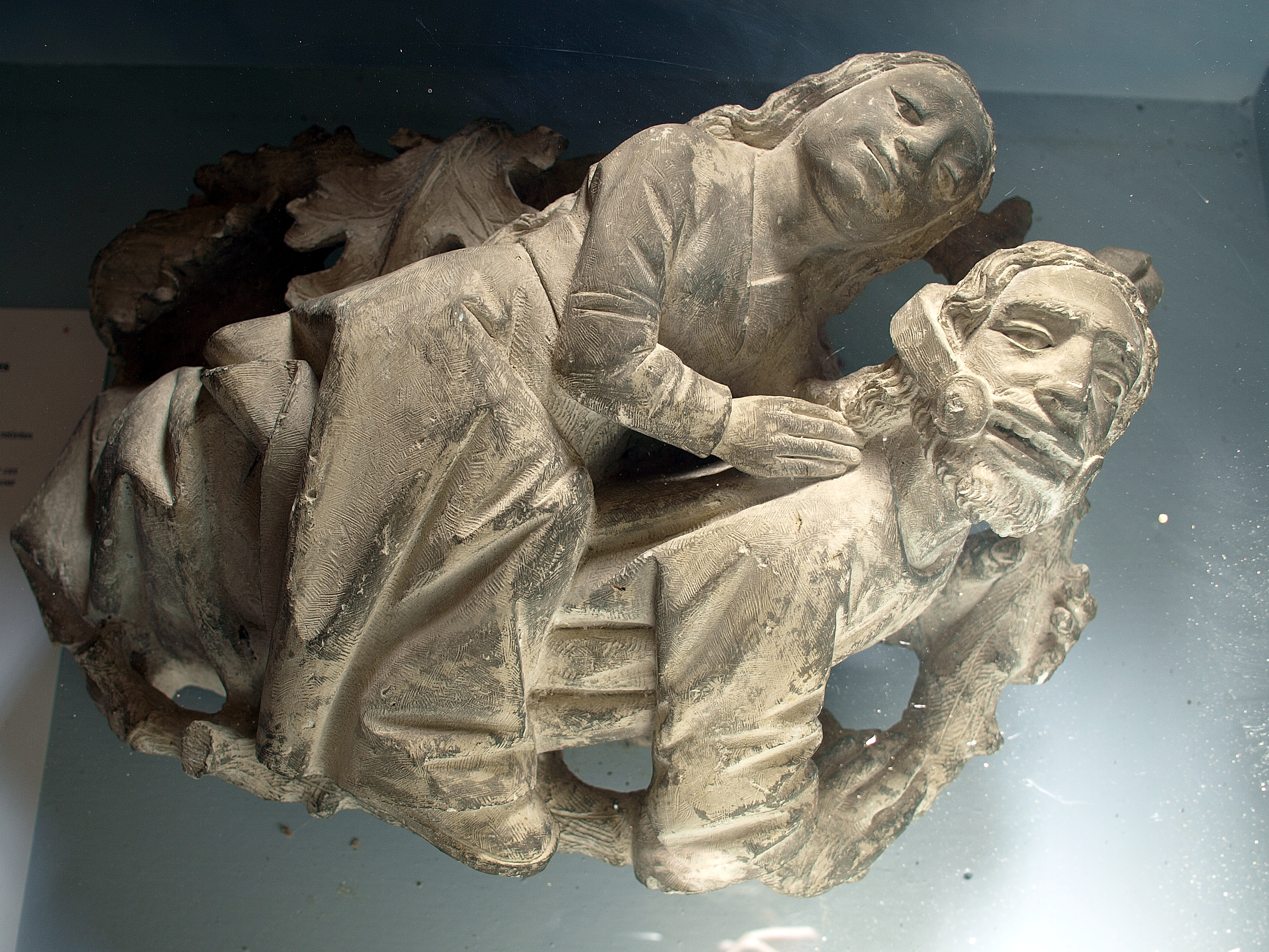
Stone sculpture, Cadouin Abbey, France, 12th century

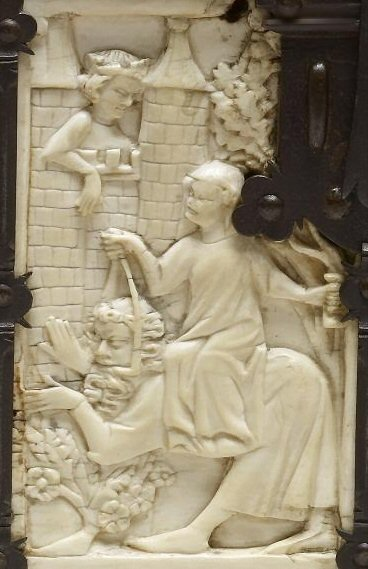
Panel of casket with scenes of romances, France, ivory, 1330–1350

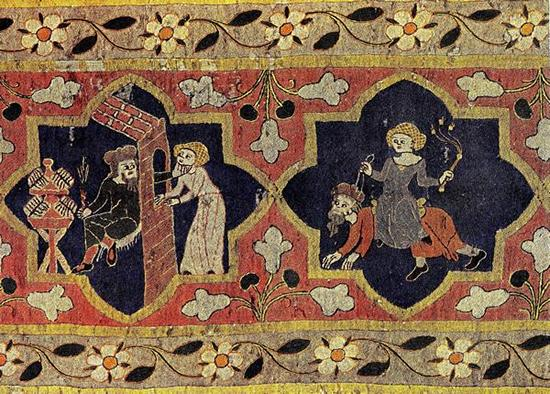
"Maltererteppich" (bench cover tapistry), 1320/30, Freiburg, Germany

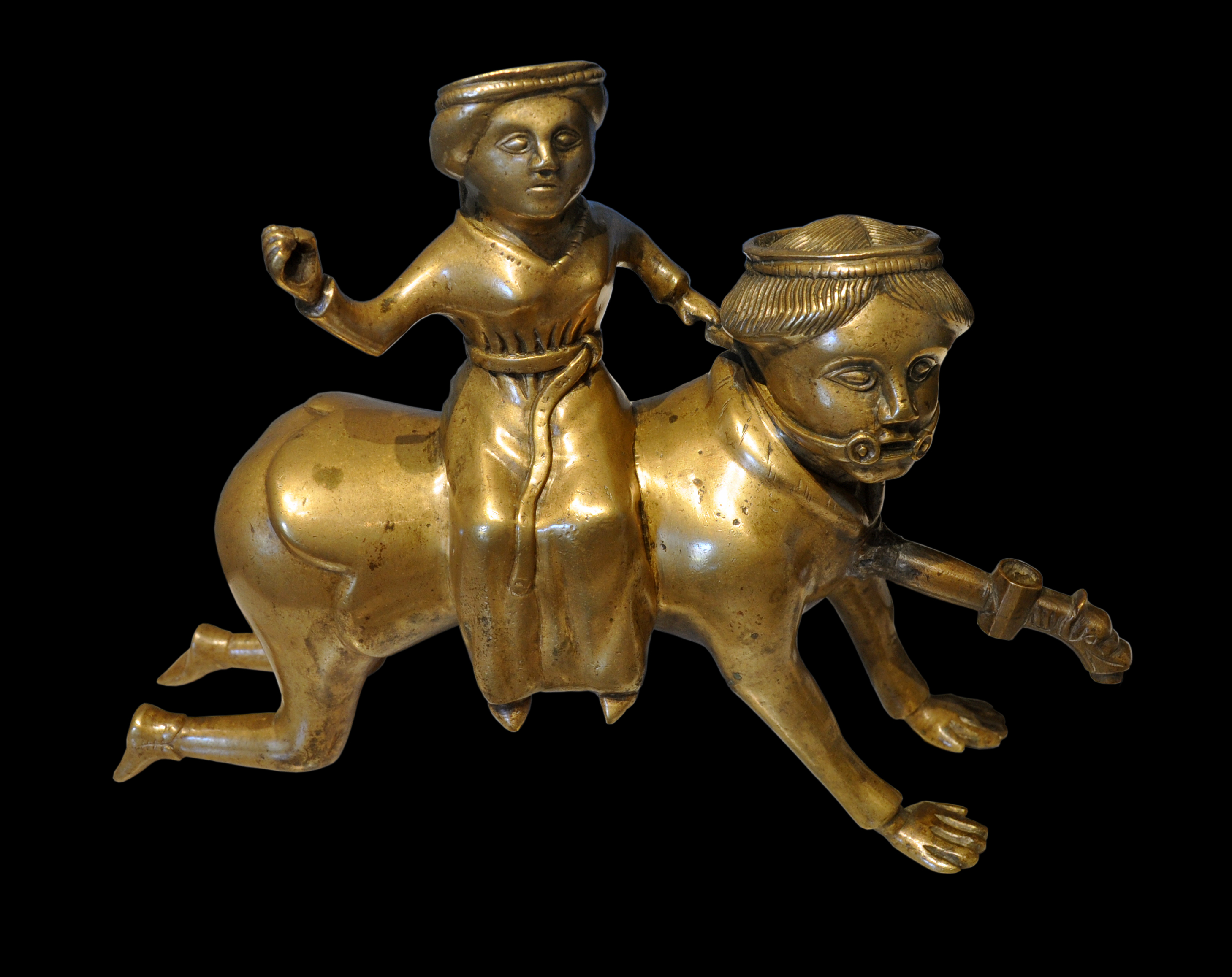
Aquamanile in the form of Phyllis and Aristotle, prob. Maasland, 1400–1450, brass

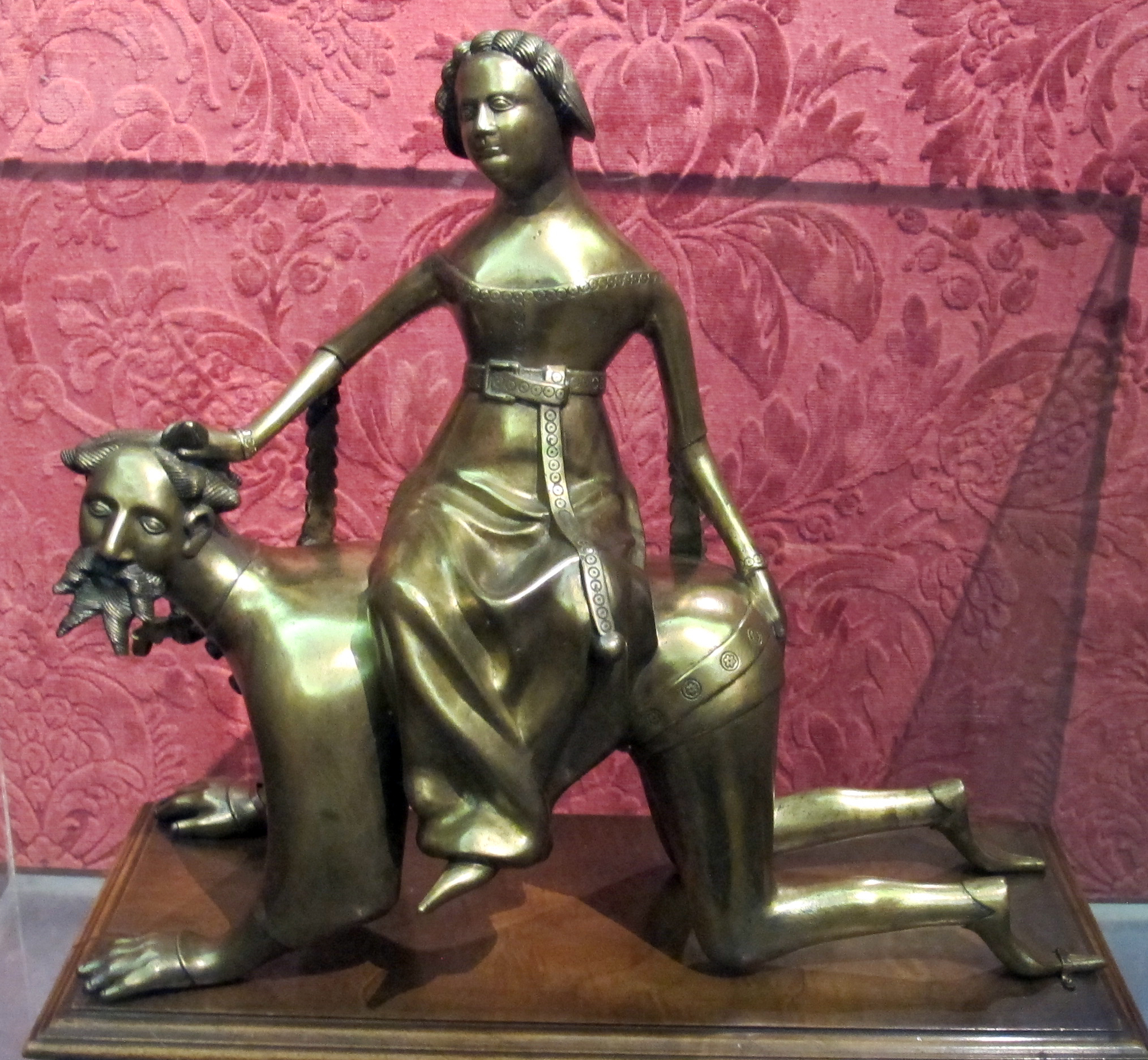
Phyllis riding and slapping Aristotle, brass aquamanile, Maasland, c. 1400

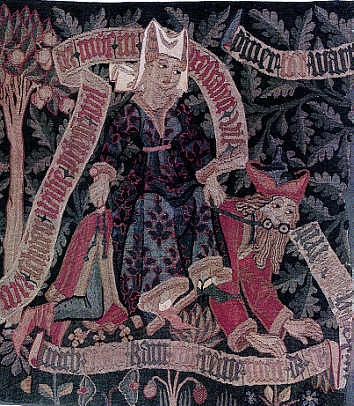
Detail of tapestry, Basel, 1470s

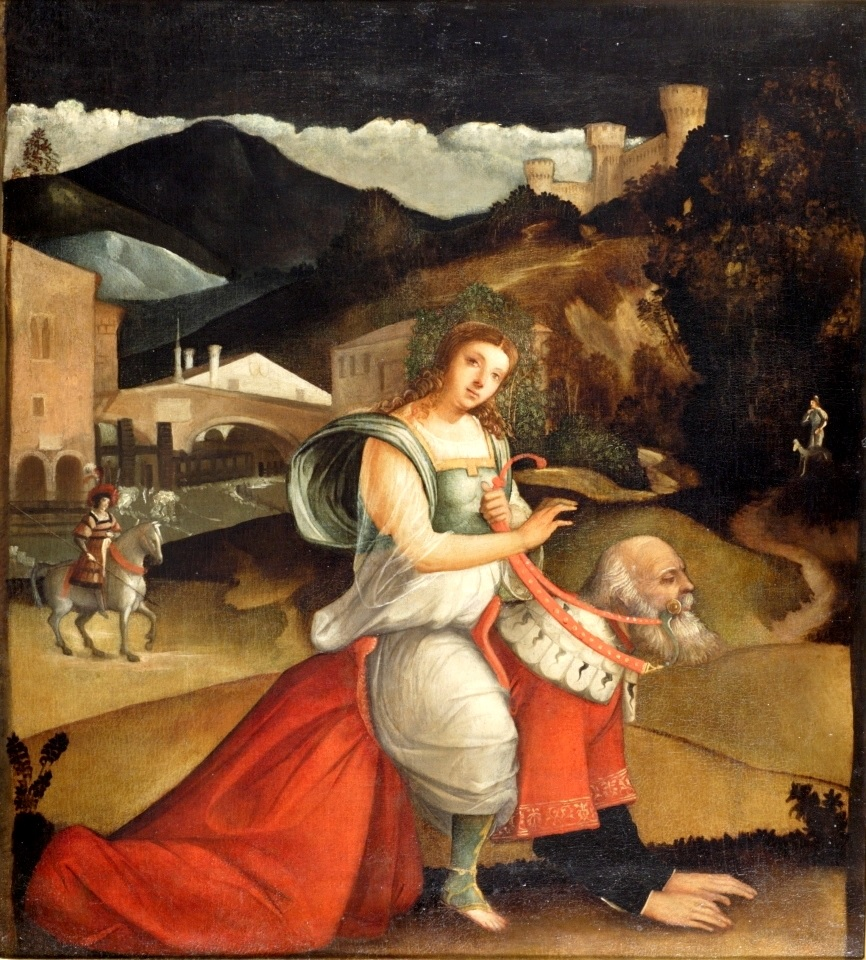
Tempera painting by Giovanni Buonconsiglio, early 1500s

=== Early Modern to Enlightenment ===
Artists such as Hans Baldung, (Note: See above for his woodcut illustration.) Albrecht Dürer, Lucas Cranach the Elder, Bartholomeus Spranger and Jan Sadeler continued to exploit the theme, eventually with Phyllis entirely naked. Alessandro Turchi called the woman Campaspe, the mistress of Alexander. The media used include engraving, stained glass, wood, and oil painting.

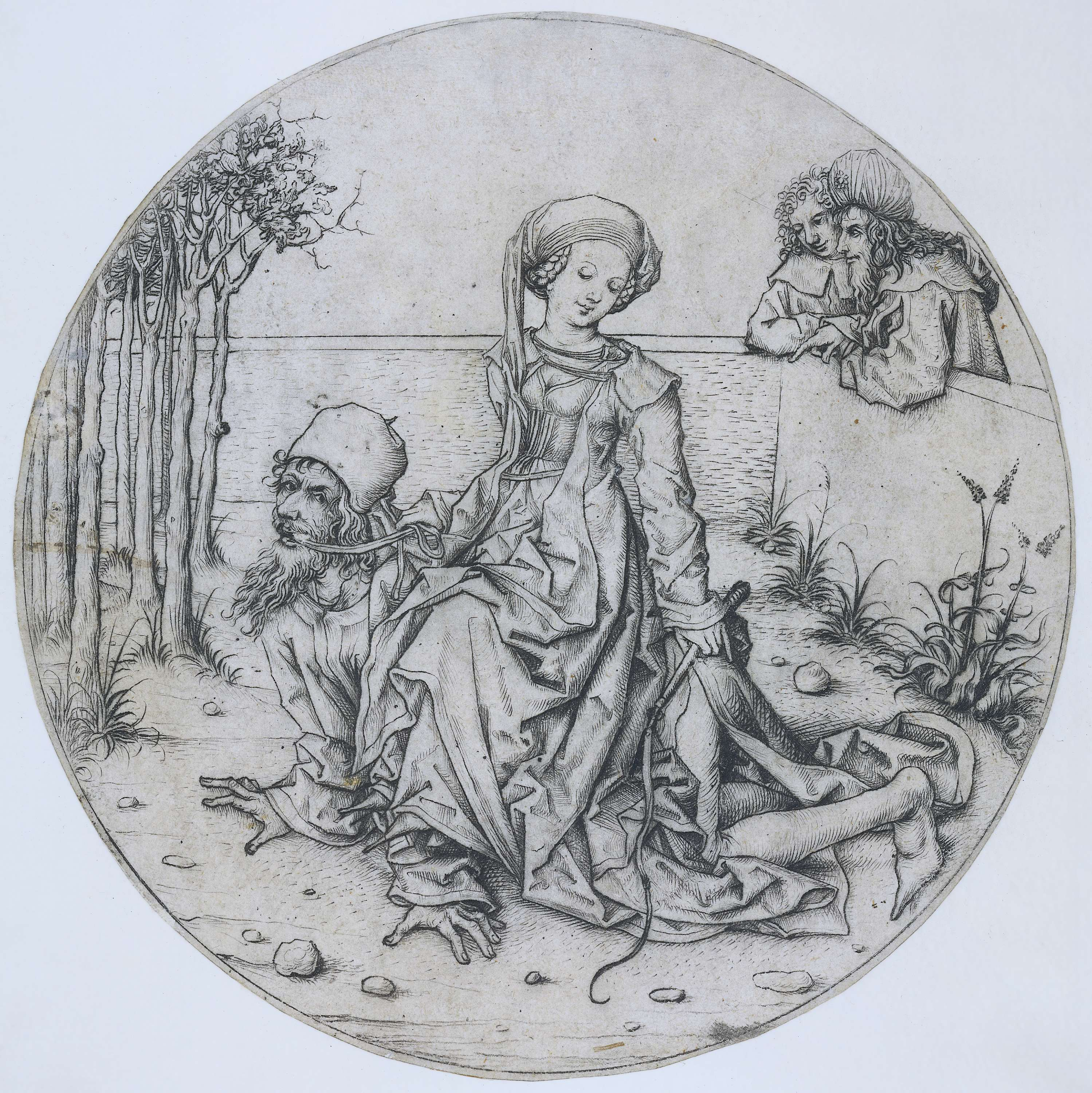
Drypoint of Aristotle ridden by Phyllis by the Housebook Master. c. 1490

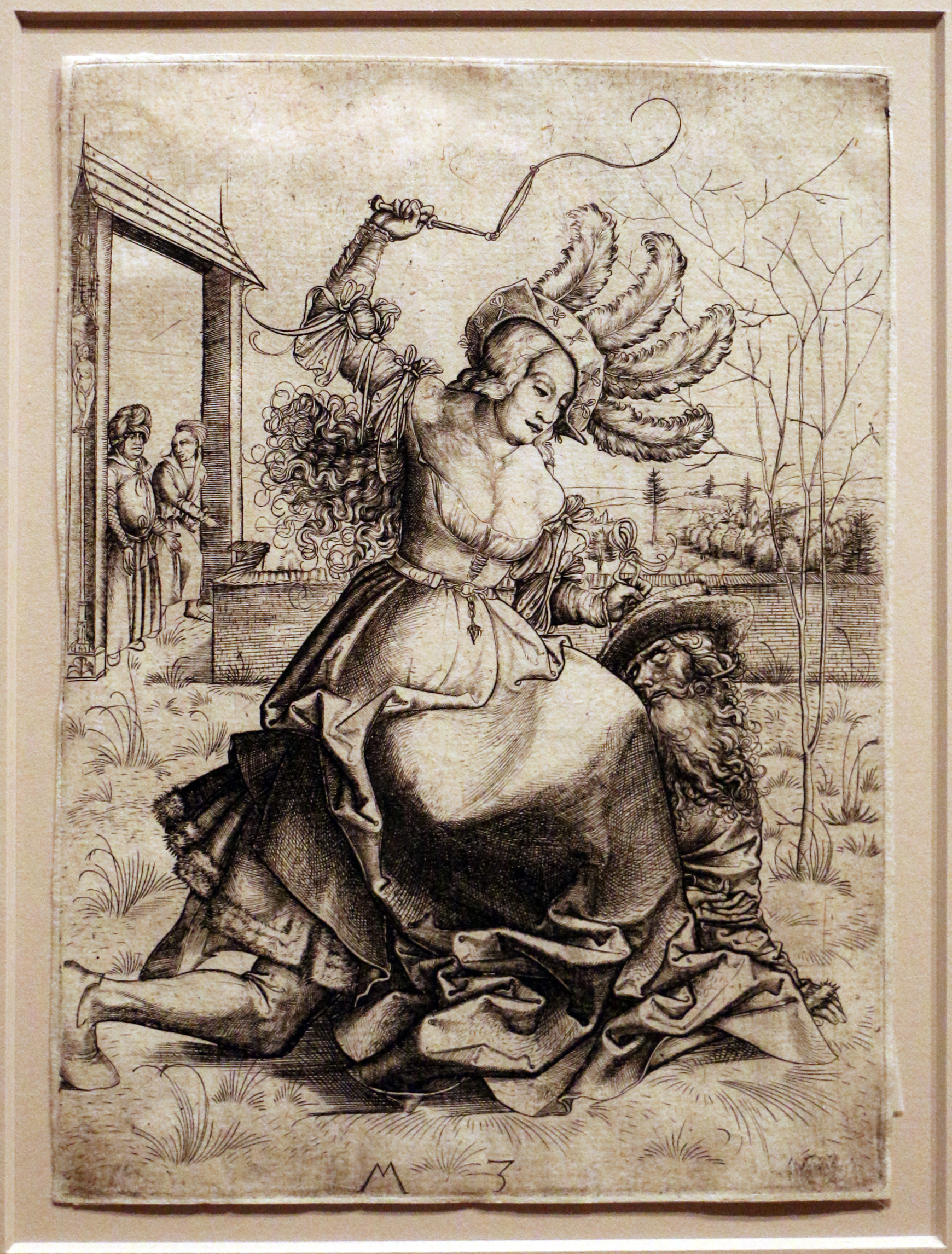
Engraving, Master MZ, c. 1500

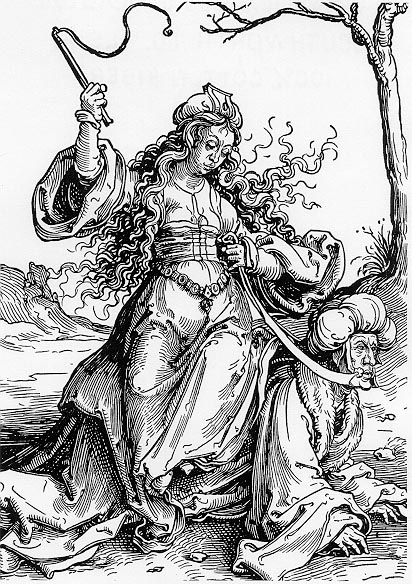
Engraving, Lucas van Leyden, c. 1520

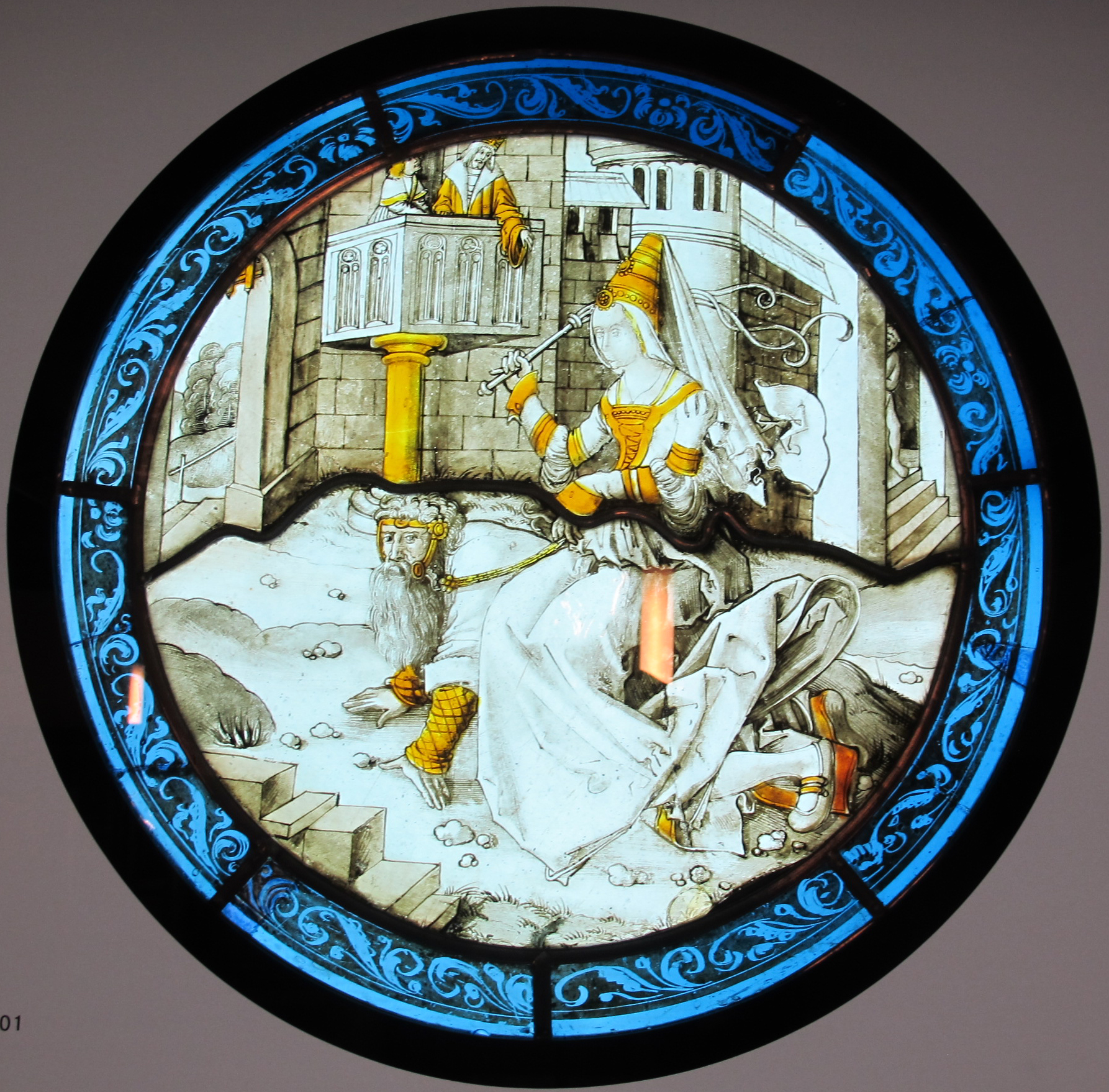
Stained glass, Germany, c. 1520

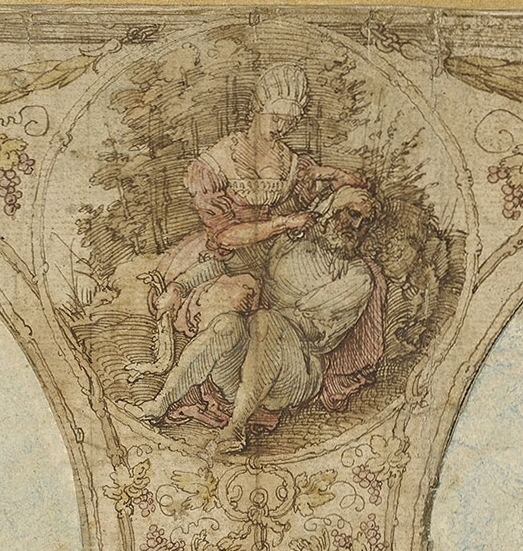
Detail of a Power of Women decoration meant for Nuremberg Town Hall, Albrecht Dürer, 1521

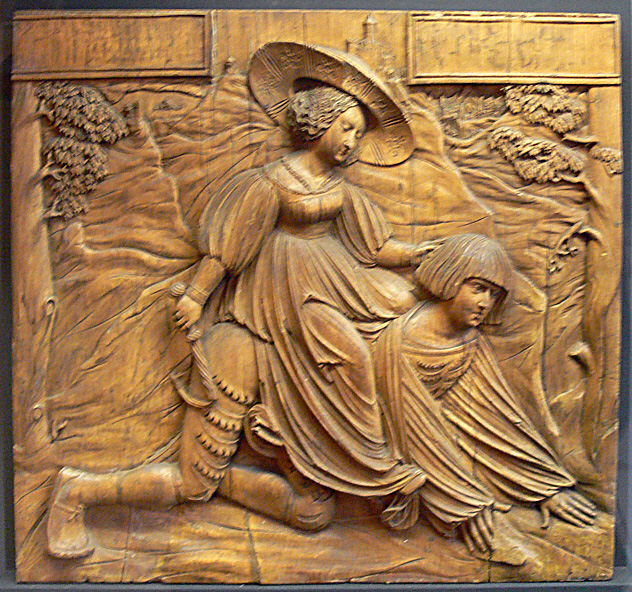
Aristotle and Phyllis, the Master of Ottobeuren, wood, 1523

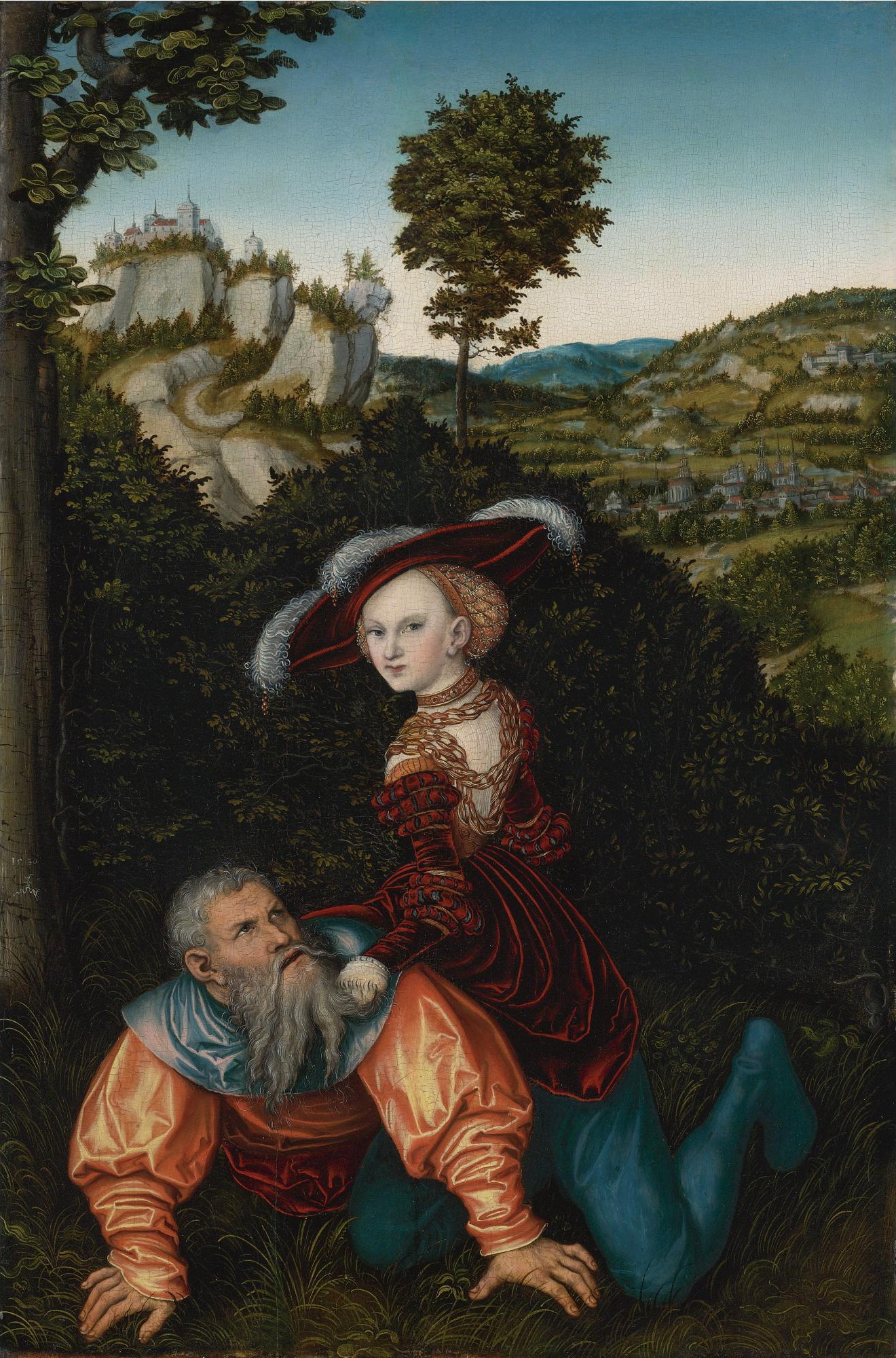
Phyllis and Aristotle, Lucas Cranach the Elder, oil on panel, 1530

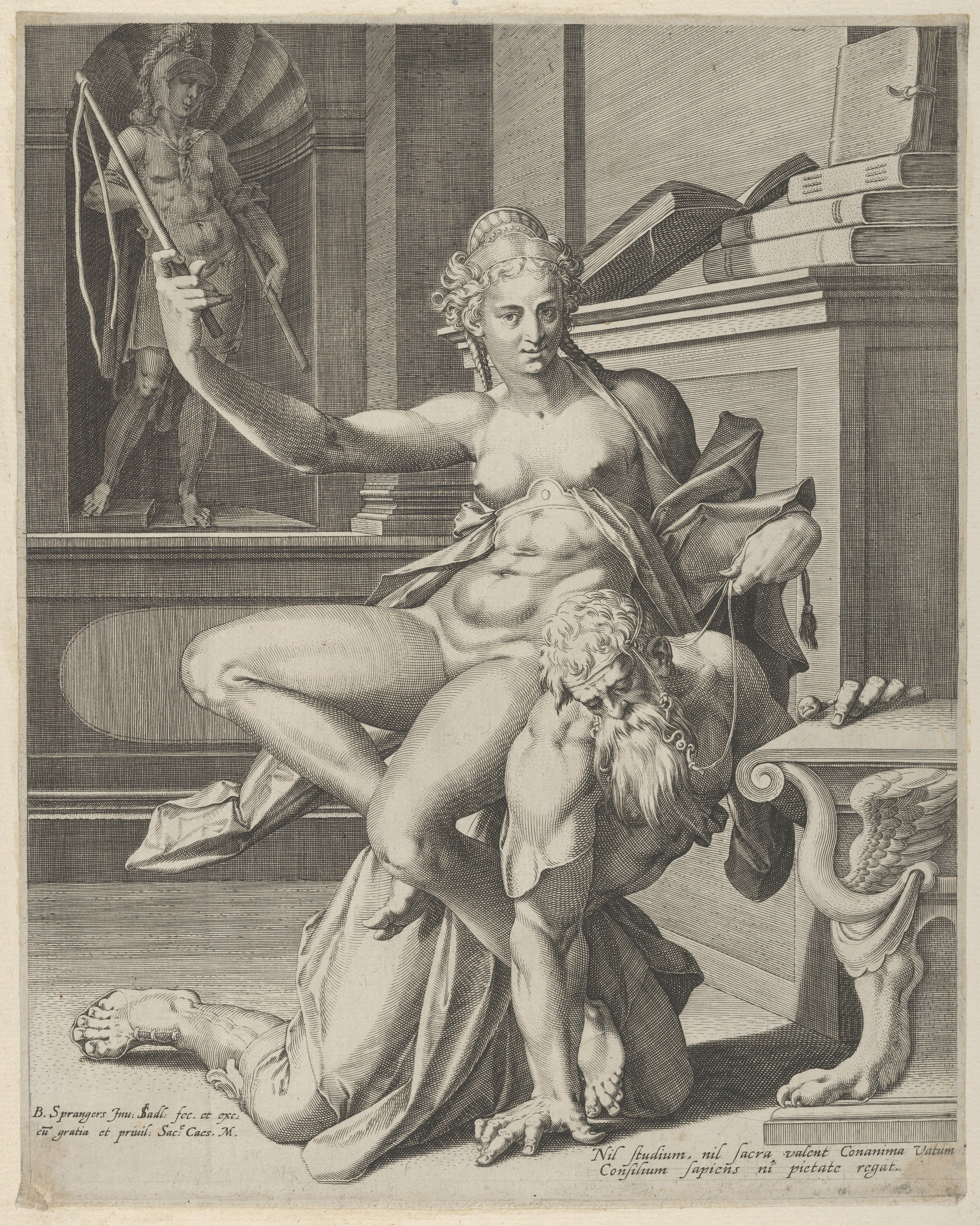
Phyllis and Aristotle, Jan Sadeler after Bartholomeus Spranger, engraving, 16th century

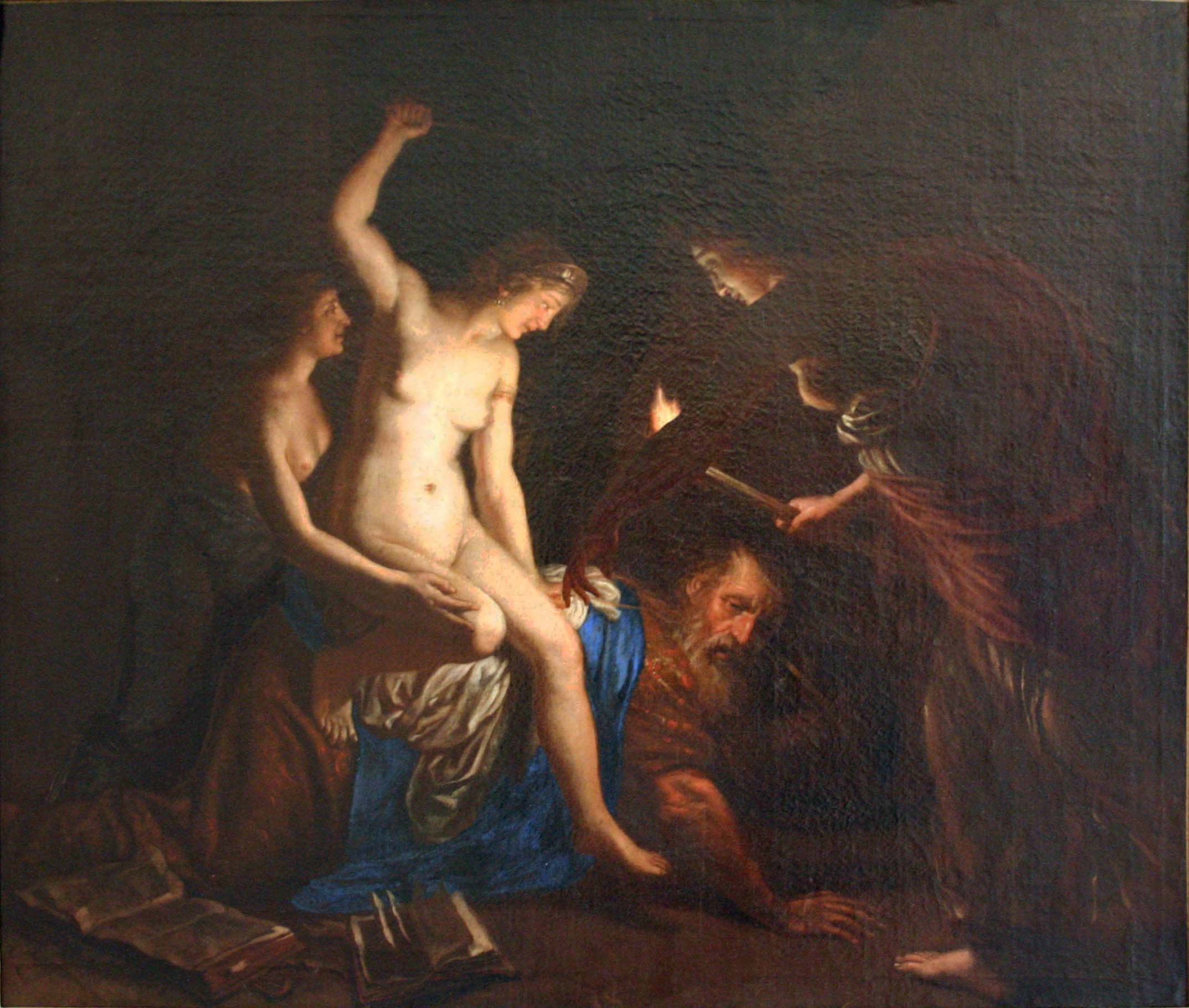
Aristotle and Campaspe, Alessandro Turchi (attrib.) Oil on canvas, 1713

=== 19th and 20th centuries ===
Artists such as Julio Ruelas continued to adapt the Phyllis and Aristotle theme. Oscar Kokoschka produced a version in 1913.

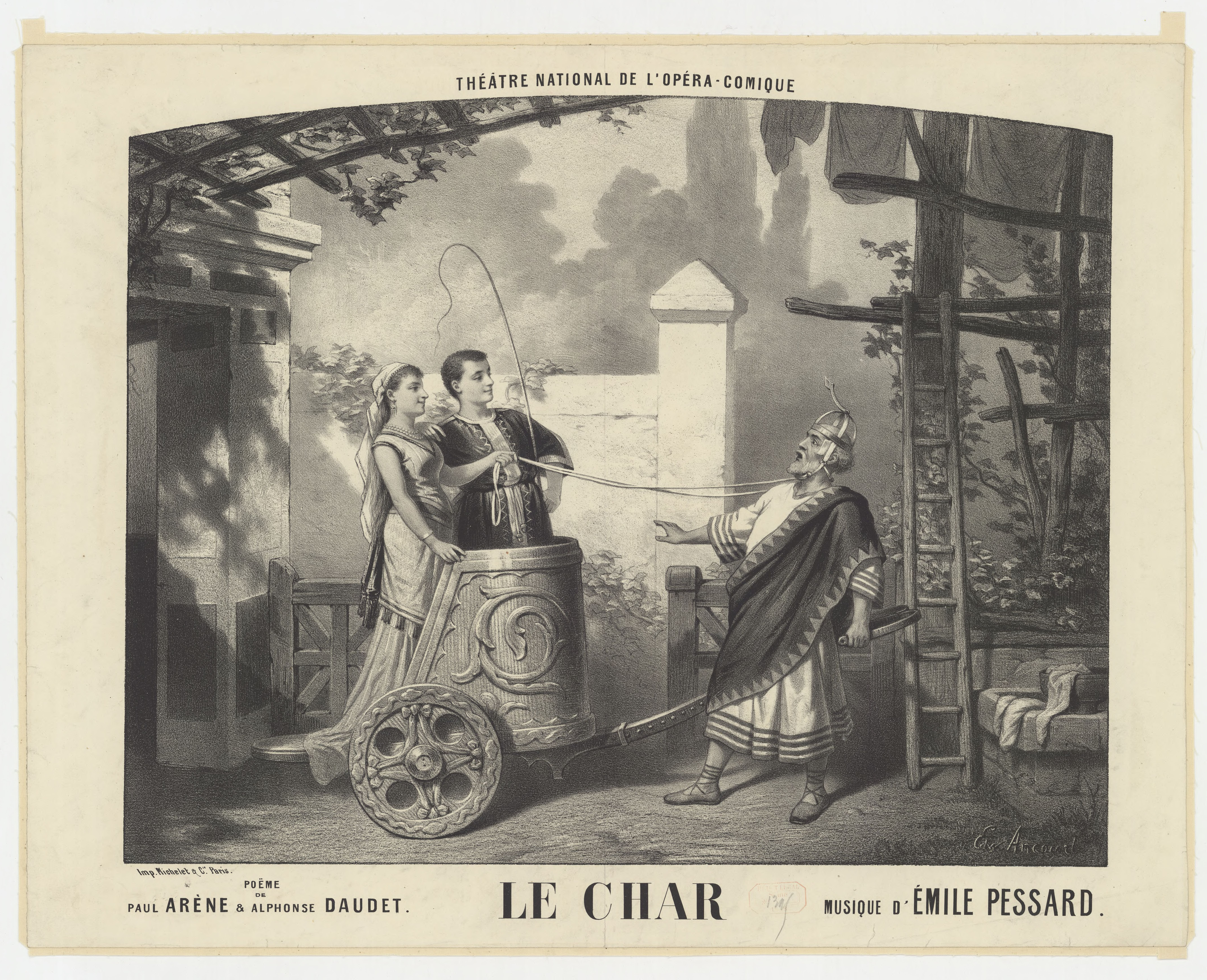
Le Char (The Chariot), poster by Edward Ancourt for opera by Émile Pessard, 1878

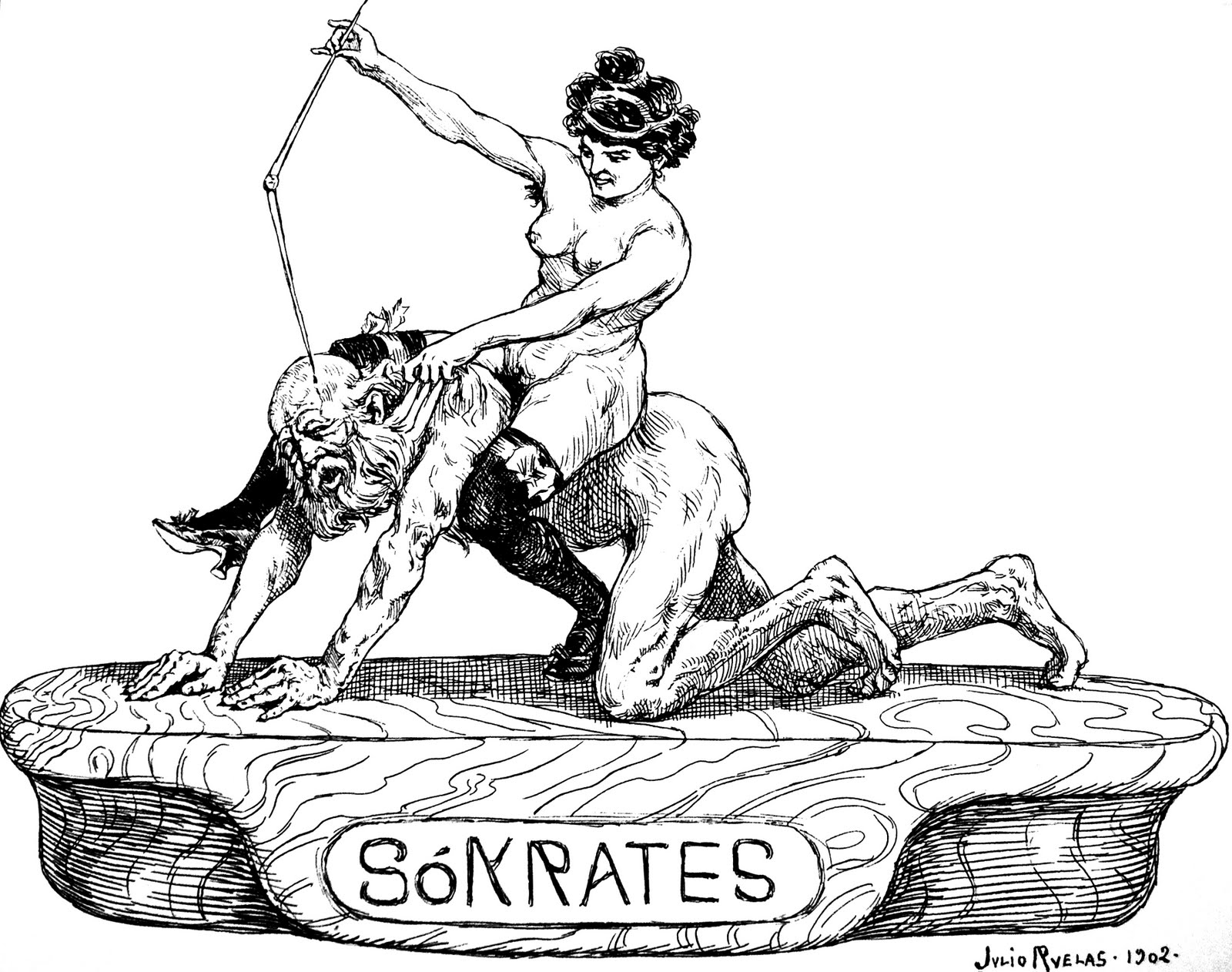
Sokrates, Julio Ruelas (1870–1907), 1902. The woman wears modern stockings and shoes
