= Phyllis Sheffield =

American photographer

- Born: December 29, 1916
- Died: July 16, 2015 (aged 98)

Phyllis Sheffield (December 29, 1916 – July 16, 2015) was a painter with a history as a documentary photographer of Miccosukee Indians in Florida. As a teenager, she helped photograph the natives living in the Everglades during trips with her aunt Florence (Stiles) Randle. She was born in Miami in 1916. Jeff Klinkenberg wrote about their work and it has been displayed at the Smithsonian. Randle was a WPA photographer. Her work is also in the P.K. Yonge Library of Florida History and the collections of the South Florida Archaeology and Ethnography Program at the Florida Museum of Natural History in Gainesville, Florida. Their work is also included in the Phyllis Sheffield Collection at the Department of Anthropology & Genealogy, Seminole Tribe of Florida.

Sheffield lived in Palatka in 1996. Her paintings include custom made maps of Florida and nautical charts. She also sells the vintage photos she and her aunt made of the Miccosukee Indians around 1937. Sheffield died on July 16, 2015.
