= Horsburgh Point =

Horsburgh Point (58°26′S 26°26′W) is a point, 3.4 nautical miles (6.3 km) northwest of Scarlett Point, on the southwest side of Montagu Island in the South Sandwich Islands. It was charted in 1930 by Discovery Investigations personnel on the Discovery II, who named it for H. Horsburgh, technical officer to the Discovery Committee.
