= Roddy the Roadman =

Children's book series by Phyllis Arkle

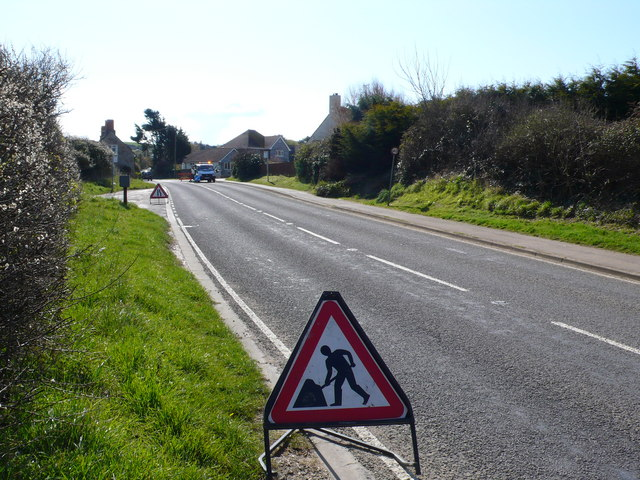
Example of a British road sign typically displayed during roadworks

Roddy the Roadman is a series of six children's books by British author Phyllis Arkle. Roddy is the workman depicted on the "roadworks ahead" traffic warning sign on British roads; in the stories he comes alive and has numerous adventures.

The first book in the series was published in 1970.

== Titles ==
- Roddy the Roadman (1970)
- Roddy and the Rustlers (1972)
- Roddy on the Motorway (1974)
- Roddy on the Canal (1975)
- Roddy and the Puma (1979)
- Roddy and the Miniature Railway (1980)
