= Phillis =

Phillis is both a surname and a given name. Notable people with the name include:

== Surname ==
- Dennis Phillis (born 1948), Australian rules footballer
- Jodi Phillis (born 1965), Australian guitarist
- Rob Phillis (born 1956), Australian retired motorcycle road racer
- Tom Phillis (1931–1962), Australian Grand Prix motorcycle road racer

== Given name ==
- Phillis Lydia Macbeth, birth name of Lydia Bilbrook (1888–1990), English actress
- Phillis Emily Cunnington (1887–1974), English doctor and historian
- Phillis Levin (born 1954), American poet
- Phillis Meti (born 1987), New Zealand golfer
- Phillis Nolan (1946–2022), Irish lawn bowler
- Phillis Wheatley (1753–1784), first published African-American poet

== See also ==
- Operation Phillis, the British service-assisted evacuation operation for British citizens in Côte d'Ivoire in November 2004
- James Fillis
- Phyllis (ship), also spelled Phillis
- Phyllis (disambiguation)
- Phillips (disambiguation)
