= Phyllida =

Phyllida or Phillida is a feminine given name derived from the genitive case of the Greek Phyllidos and the Latin Phyllidis, both meaning “foliage.” It is a variant form of Phyllis.

== Phillida ==
- Phillida Bunkle (born 1944), New Zealand politician
- Phillida Gili, British children's book illustrator
- Phillida Nicholson (1924–2021), Welsh-born artist and Land Girl

== Phyllida ==
- Phyllida Ashley (1894–1975), American pianist
- Phyllida Barlow (1944–2023), British sculptor
- Phyllida Law (1932−2026), Scottish actress
- Phyllida Lloyd (born 1957), British film and theatre director
- Phyllida Crowley Smith (born 1968), English ballerina, theatre actress and choreographer
