= Phyllis of Thrace =

Character in Greek mythology

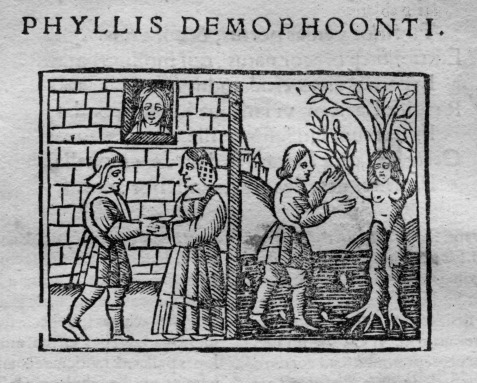
Woodcut of Phyllis and Demophon from Heroides, Venice, early 16th century

Phyllis (Ancient Greek: Φυλλίς, romanized: Phullís, lit. 'leaves', 'foliage' or 'greenery') is a character in Greek mythology, daughter of a Thracian king (according to some, of Sithon; most other accounts do not give her father's name at all, but one states he is named either Philander, Ciasus, or Thelus). She married Demophon (also spelled Demophoon), King of Athens and son of Theseus, when he stopped in Thrace on his journey home from the Trojan War.

== Mythology ==
Demophon, duty bound to Greece, returns home to help his father, leaving Phyllis behind. She sends him away with a casket, telling him that it contains a sacrament of Rhea and asking him to open it only if he has given up hope of returning to her. From here, the story diverges. In one version, Phyllis realizes that he will not return and commits suicide by hanging herself from a tree. Where she is buried, an almond tree grows, which blossoms when Demophon returns to her. In another version, Demophon opens the casket and, horrified by what he sees inside, rides off in such great haste that his horse stumbles and he accidentally falls on his own sword.

There is also some confusion regarding which nut tree she becomes, as hazelnuts were long called nux Phyllidos, and are still sometimes called "filberts" today. In English, this version goes back at least to Gower, who wrote in Confessio Amantis (ca. 1390):

That Phyllis in the same throwe
Was schape into a notetre,
That alle men it mihte se,
And after Phyllis philliberd
This tre was cleped in the yerd,
And yit for Demephon to schame
Into this dai it berth the name.

— Book 4, Lines 866–72

This story most notably appears in the second poem of Ovid's Heroides, a book of epistolary poems from mythological women to their respective men, and it also appears in the Aitia of Callimachus.

The Nine Ways is derived from the story of Phyllis, who is said to return nine times to the shores to wait for Demophon's return.

"Phyllis" (or "Phillis") is commonly used as a female given name; variants of it are "Phillida" and "Phyllida".

She is also mentioned in the song "I love, alas, I love thee" by Thomas Morley. In this song, she is compared to Amaryllis, who, when she dies, a flower grows from her blood that is shed on the ground. Amaryllis is deemed "more lovely" in the song because while Phyllis' death creates just a nut tree, Amaryllis blooms into an astounding flower that catches the attention of her love, the handsome, strong shepherd Alteo.

Jacob van Eyck (1590–1657), a Dutch nobleman and musician, who worked as a composer, carillon player, organist, and recorder virtuoso, composed several pieces for the recorder that refer to Philis, for example: "Philis schooner Herderin (Philis, Fair Sheperdhess)" and "Philis quam Philander tegen (Philis Met Philander) that are found in recorder books. See, for example, "The Sweet Pipes Recorder, Book Two," by Gerald Burakoff, Paul Clark and William E. Hettrick, Sweet Pipes, Inc.1998.

== See also ==
- 556 Phyllis

== Sources ==
- Fulkerson, Laurel. "Reading dangerously: Phyllis, Dido, Ariadne, and Medea". The Ovidian Heroine as Author. Cambridge: Cambridge University Press, 2005.
