= Phyllis La Fond =

American performer

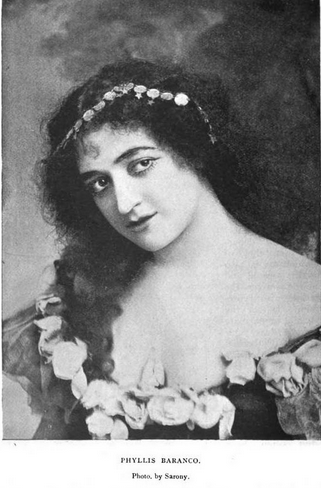
- Phyllis Baranco, from an 1897 publication; photo by Sarony
- Born: about 1875
- Other names: Felicia Baranco, Phyllis Baranco, Phyllis la Fond, Felice Valbuena, Selice Valbuenna
- Occupation: Singer

Phyllis La Fond (born about 1875) was an American singer, also known as Felicia Baranco, Phyllis Baranco and Felice Valbuena. She lived in New York City, appeared on Broadway, and toured in the United States. During World War I, she entertained American troops.

== Early life and education ==
La Fond may have been born in France, and educated in Germany and Russia, initially as a violin student.

== Career ==
In the 1890s, Baranco appeared in The Fete Campetre [sic] conducted by Oscar Hammerstein on the Olympia Roof, and in The Ballet Girl (1898) at the Columbia Theatre in Brooklyn. On Broadway, she was a "Spanish dancer" in the revue Fiddle-Dee-Dee (1900–1901), and she appeared in musicals including The Three Dragoons (1899), The Little Duchess (1902), starring Anna Held, and The Rollicking Girl (1905). She was in a traveling company of Cleo in 1907, and DuBarry in 1908, both starring Mrs. Leslie Carter.

La Fond, a soprano, sang in concerts in New York and toured the midwest in the 1910s, often accompanied by Edna Rothwell. "Miss La Fond charmed her listeners with the finish and beauty of her delivery, clarity of diction, and general artistic style," noted a 1917 report. During World War I, she sang for the troops at American bases, and she spoke in favor of women's trousers, saying "Many women have wanted to wear breeches for years, and now is their chance". She encouraged younger singers to maintain good health, wear loose clothing, and study languages. She also supported the work of American composers.

As "Felice Valbuena", she sang the role of Santuzza in productions of Cavalleria rusticana in 1921 and 1922.
