= Phyllis Adams =

American musician

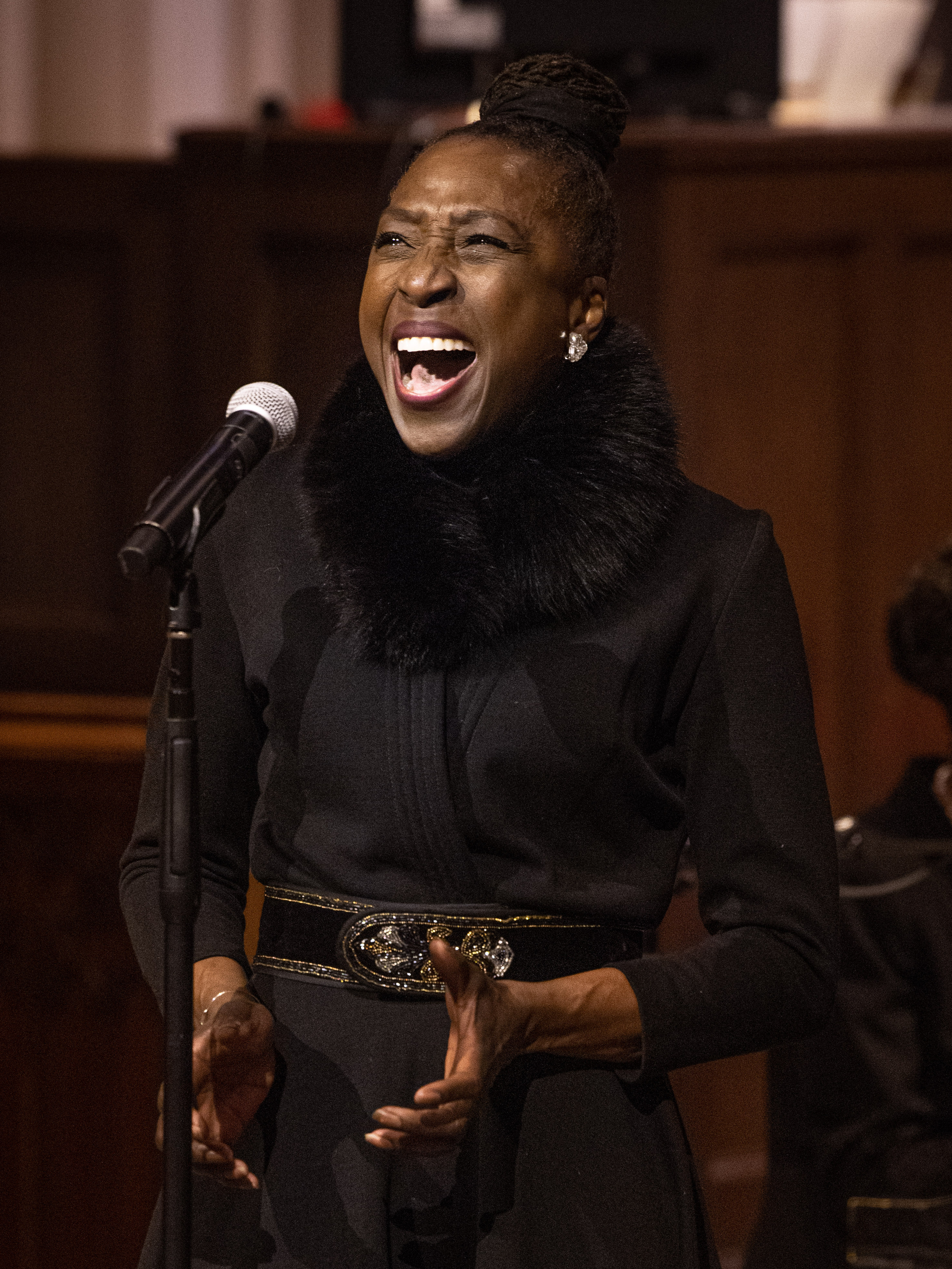
Adams in 2025

Phyllis Adams (born 1964 or 1965) is an American soprano vocalist and flight attendant.

She performed as part of the group "Song Rise To Thee" with pianist Leila Bolden singing classical sacred music at the 2017 Carter Center Human Rights Defenders Forum. As a result of that performance, she was asked by Jimmy Carter himself to perform at a future event – his funeral. Over the years, she kept the request secret, only telling a few individuals close to her. On January 9, 2025, she was indeed the soloist at the funeral of Jimmy Carter, singing Amazing Grace with Bolden and the United States Marine Band at the Washington National Cathedral service.

== Education and career ==
Adams is a graduate of Lincoln Elementary, Seth McKeel Junior High School and Kathleen Senior High School in Florida. She attended Bethune–Cookman University on a four-year chorale scholarship. Based in Atlanta, Georgia, she works as an international flight attendant for Delta Air Lines in addition to her singing career.

Adams was also a performer in the Macy's Thanksgiving Day Parade in 2018 and 2019.
