= Phyllis Rappeport =

American pianist (1929–2020)

Phyllis Rappeport (19 February 1929 – 9 January 2020) was an American pianist, teacher, and chamber musician in the Kalamazoo, MI area and Emeritus Professor of Piano at Western Michigan University (WMU). She is the namesake and creator of the Phyllis Rappeport Accompanying Scholarship and the Excellence in Accompanying Scholarship endowments for WMU's Irving S. Gilmore School of Music. She was an active volunteer for the Kalamazoo Area Music Teachers Association, the Stulberg International String Competition, and the Gilmore International Keyboard Festival (Rappeport was considered a partner of the Gilmore Keyboard Festival). In 2024, the Phyllis Rappeport Piano Legacy Series was established in her honor.

== Education & Early Career ==
Phyllis Rappeport was born and raised in New York City. She attended the Mannes College of Music, studied with Nadia Reisenberg, and completed a degree at Queens College. After her undergraduate studies, Rappeport served as assistant director of the Turnau Opera Players of New York. She then completed a degree at the University of Illinois, which led her to a Fulbright Scholarship in Hamburg. She is an alumna of the Tanglewood Music Center and was a staff accompanist at the Aspen Music Festival.

Rappeport taught piano at Florida State University and Rollins College in Orlando. She was a faculty member at Yale University from 1958-1964. In 1960, she joined the faculty of Frances Clark's New School for Music Study in Princeton, NJ. Rappeport moved to Kalamazoo and joined the WMU faculty in 1966. Seeing an opportunity to build up the piano program, she attended nearly all of the concerts put on by the department during her tenure.

Other faculty positions included a sabbatical as visiting Professor of Piano at Cornell University in 1975 and a position at the University of North Carolina at Chapel Hill during the 1984-85 academic year. She retired from WMU faculty after 30 years, in 1996.

== Arts in Kalamazoo ==
Rappeport "created a significant artistic footprint in the [Kalamazoo] community" through her involvement with the Fontana Music Festival (now Fontana Chamber Arts) as one of its original performing members, the Kalamazoo Area Music Teachers Association and the Stulberg International String Competition as an active volunteer, the Gilmore International Keyboard Festival, the BRAVO! concert series showcasing musical talent of local high school-aged students, and Colleagues International (formerly the Council of International Programs). She was a frequent performer with WMU colleague and composer C. Curtis-Smith. In 1984, along with violinist Barry Ross, she organized a "Voices for Survival" peace concert raising $12,000 for Physicians for Social Responsibility. In 2012, she organized a benefit concert ("Raising Dough: The Concert") for Kalamazoo's Sarkozy Bakery after it burned down, earning $25,000. After her death, WMU Piano Faculty members Lori Sims and Yu-Lien The organized the Phyllis Rappeport Piano Competition for students ages 12–18 (now the Young Artists Exposition).

=== Awards Received ===
- Alumni Award for Teaching Excellence – Western Michigan University, 1980
- Community Medal of Arts Award – Arts Council of Greater Kalamazoo, 1987
- Distinguished Service Award – WMU College of Fine Arts, 1995

=== Notable Performances ===
All entries: Phyllis Rappeport, piano.

- Sur, Donald. "Five Bagatelles" (1957). Princeton, 1961, Premiere Performance.
- Hiller, Lejaren A. "Machine Music (1964) for Piano, Percussion, and Tape." On Electronic Music From The University Of Illinois. Heliodor HS25047, 1967, LP.
- Stravinsky, Igor. "The Rite of Spring" for four-hands piano. Arr. C. Curtis-Smith. On Stravinski: The Rite of Spring. Recorded January 26, 1974. Recorded Publications Company Z 80961-80962, LP.
- Zupko, Ramon. "Masques" (1973-8). On Music by Ramon Zupko. Composers Recordings Inc. CRI SD 425, 1979, LP.
- Denisov, Edison. "Sonata for Alto Saxophone and Piano" (1970). On Sonatas for Saxophone. Coronet Recording Company S 3044, LP.
