= 556 Phyllis =

Main-belt asteroid

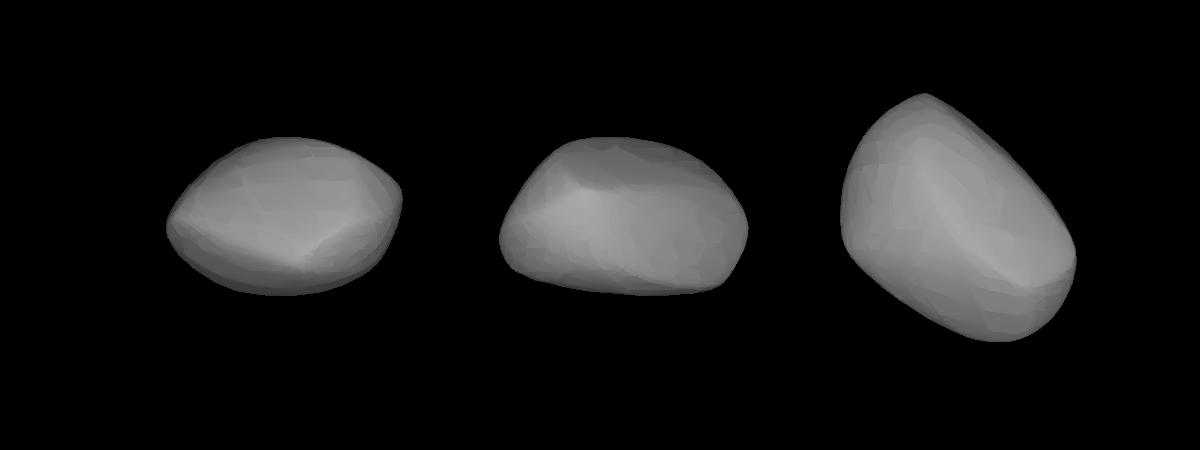
- A three-dimensional model of 556 Phyllis based on its light curve

Discovery
- Discovered by: Paul Götz
- Discovery site: Heidelberg
- Discovery date: 8 January 1905

Designations
- Pronunciation: /ˈfɪlɪs/ FIL-iss
- Alternative designations: 1905 PW

Orbital characteristics
- Epoch 31 July 2016 (JD 2457600.5)
- Uncertainty parameter 0
- Observation arc: 108.29 yr (39553 d)
- Aphelion: 2.7179 AU (406.59 Gm)
- Perihelion: 2.2115 AU (330.84 Gm)
- Semi-major axis: 2.4647 AU (368.71 Gm)
- Eccentricity: 0.10273
- Orbital period (sidereal): 3.87 yr (1413.4 d)
- Mean anomaly: 301.06°
- Mean motion: 0° 15^{m} 16.956^{s} / day
- Inclination: 5.2400°
- Longitude of ascending node: 286.126°
- Argument of perihelion: 177.439°

Physical characteristics
- Mean radius: 18.905±0.55 km
- Synodic rotation period: 4.293 h (0.1789 d)
- Geometric albedo: 0.1853±0.011
- Absolute magnitude (H): 9.56

556 Phyllis is a minor planet orbiting the Sun. It is an S-type asteroid with a diameter of 38 km and a geometric albedo of 0.185. Based on photometric observations between 1998 and 2006, it has a synodic rotation period of 4.293 ± 0.001 hours. The asteroid is named after Phyllis, a character in Greek mythology.
