= Phyllis T. Johnson =

American parasitologist, virologist and marine biologist (born 1926)

- Born: August 8, 1926 (age 100); Salem, Oregon, U.S.

Academic work
- Discipline: Marine Pathologist
- Institutions: National Marine Fisheries Laboratory, Smithsonian Institution, University of California, Irvine
- Notable works: Histology of the Blue Crab, C. sapidus

Phyllis Truth Johnson (born August 8, 1926) is an American parasitologist, virologist, and marine biologist.

== Education ==
Phyllis T. Johnson studied zoology at the University of California, Berkeley and obtained a bachelor's degree in 1948. During her doctoral studies she studied a collection of South American fleas at Walter Reed Army Medical Center in Washington, D.C. However, during this time she also worked for six months during the Korean War to investigate an outbreak of hemorrhagic fever among U.S. soldiers caused by Hantaviruses. In 1954, the University of California, Berkeley awarded her a doctorate in parasitology. Her doctoral thesis (‘A classification of the Siphonaptera of South America’) was published in 1957 by the Entomological Society of Washington.

== Entomology ==
From 1955 to 1958, Johnson worked as curator of the collection of lice and fleas at the Department of Agriculture museum, (later renamed the Smithsonian Institution's National Museum of Natural History). She described over a dozen new species of fleas infesting hosts from North and South American. Already in 1954 Johnson published a study on the isolation and culture of Rickettsia (orientia) tsutsugamushi, the causative agent of tsutsugamushi fever transmitted by trombidiform mites. From 1959-1963, Johnson worked at the Gorgas Memorial Institute for Health Studies in Panama and studied the epidemiology of leishmaniasis. At the same time, she published further work on the taxonomy of lice and fleas.

== Pathology of invertebrates ==
In 1964 Johnson went to the University of California, Irvine as a pathobiologist. Since there was no laboratory space available at the beginning of her work, she created a bibliography on the pathology of invertebrates (non-insects) over a period of several years. Her own publications from this period dealt with the pathology of marine mussels, echinoderms and numerous other invertebrate taxa. In 1970 Johnson moved to the California Institute of Technology and in 1971 to the Division of Environmental Studies, now the Smithsonian Institution Environmental Research Center, in Edgewater, Maryland.

From 1972 onwards, Johnson's last scientific station was the National Marine Fisheries Laboratory in Oxford, Maryland. There, until she retired in 1987, she researched exclusively the anatomy, pathology and pathogens of aquatic crustaceans. Johnson's key research findings include descriptions of several viruses that cause diseases in the economically important blue crab (Callinectes sapidus). Of eight pathogenic viruses of this type of crab that were discovered by 2003, seven were either described by Johnson herself, or the description was based on her research. In addition, Johnson made important contributions to other blue crab diseases, namely bacterial and unicellular infections, which are exacerbated by stress during trapping and subsequent storage. She compiled her work in the 1980 publication 'Histology of the blue crab, C. sapidus' Johnson's last publications in the 1980s dealt with parasites and pathogens of economically important crustaceans, lobsters, king crabs, shrimps and others.

== Awards and honors ==
Johnson was the first female vice president and president of the Society of Invertebrate Pathology (1978–1982). Honors include award of the City of Montpellier Medal for contributions to the study of marine invertebrate pathology and the US Department of Commerce Bronze Medal (1981).
