= Tomb of Phyllis Louise Lawrence =

- مقبره فیلس لوئس لارنس
- Interactive map of Tomb of Phyllis Louise Lawrence
- Location: Gora Qabaristan, Karachi, Sindh, Pakistan
- Coordinates: 24.8556°N 67.0499°E
- Builder: Sir Henry Staveley Lawrence
- Type: Funerary monument
- Material: White marble (reclad with yellow stone in 2007)
- Dedicated to: Phyllis Louise Lawrence

Tomb of Phyllis Louise Lawrence is the tomb of an early 20th-century philanthropist in Karachi, named Phyllis Louise Lawrence. It is situated in Gora Qabaristan, Karachi.

== History ==
The tomb was built by her husband, Sir Henry Staveley Lawrence, in her memory. Located in a historical British-era graveyard, the mausoleum consists of a dome supported by six pillars.

In 2007, restoration work replaced the original white marble with yellow stone.

== Lady Phyllis ==
Phyllis Louise Lawrence, commonly referred to as Lady Phyllis, (August 24, 1868 – June 30, 1912) was a 20th-century philanthropist who worked to improve the health and education for Sindhi women. She was proficient in Sindhi language.

Lady Phyllis was also a known equestrian enthusiast. On June 30, 1912, a solo carriage ride resulted in her demise when her long hair got tangled in the carriage wheel spokes, leading to her being dragged until the horses stopped.

In the aftermath of her unexpected death, her spouse, a British colonial administrator in Karachi, constructed a marble tomb in her memory. Phyllis Louise Lawrence Institute, named after her, was established in 1912 which is now part of the Cowasjee School of Midwifery at the Lady Dufferin Hospital.
