= Phyllis (mythology) =

Phyllis in Greek mythology

In Greek mythology, Phyllis (Ancient Greek: Φυλλίς, romanized: Phullís, lit. 'leaves', 'foliage' or 'greenery') may refer to the following characters:

- Phyllis, river god of the homonymous river in Bithynia and father of Dipsacus by a local meadow nymph.
- Phyllis, a Cilician who bore Oeneus to Ereuthalion. This son fought under Dionysus in the latter's conflict with Poseidon.
- Phyllis, a Carian woman and mother by Margasus of Alcaeus who was counted among the Trojans.
- Phyllis, daughter of king Sithon, in Thrace, who fell in love with Demophon on his return from Troy to Greece.
