= Phyllis Arkle =

English children's author

- Born: Phyllis Ethel Griffiths; 23 April 1910; Chester, Cheshire, England
- Died: 10 October 1997; Berkshire, England
- Occupation: Author
- Spouse: Edward Arkle
- Writing career
- Language: English
- Genre: Children's literature

Phyllis Arkle (Chester, 23 April 1910 – 10 October 1997), was an English author of children's books.

== Biography ==
Arkle (formerly Griffiths) was born and educated in Chester, but 1959 saw her move to the village of Twyford, Berkshire. Among her works was The Railway Cat (1983) and the Roddy the Roadman series (beginning in 1970).

She married Edward Arkle. She died in 1997, aged 87 years.

== Bibliography ==
- Roddy the Roadman (1970)
- Roddy and the Rustlers (1972)
- Magic at Midnight (1974)
- Roddy on the Motorway (1974)
- Roddy on the Canal (1975)
- Grandma's Own Zoo (1979)
- Roddy and the Puma (1979)
- The Village Dinosaur (1979)
- The Adventures of Blunter Button (1980)
- Magic in the Air (1980)
- Roddy and the Miniature Railway (1980)
- Two Village Dinosaurs (1981)
- The Railway Cat (1985)
- The Real Sawrey (1985)
- The Railway Cat and Digby (1986)
- The Railway Cat's Secret (1987)
- The Dinosaur Field (1989)
- The Railway Cat on the Run (1996)
- The Railway Cat and the Ghost (1997)
- The Railway Cat and the Horse (1999)
