= Phyllis Bay =

Phyllis Bay (58°28′S 26°18′W) is a small bight between Allen and Scarlett Points at the south end of Montagu Island, in the South Sandwich Islands. The feature was roughly outlined by Bellingshausen in 1819–20. Charted in 1930 by DI personnel on the Discovery II and named for Phyllis V. Horton, daughter of Lieutenant Commander W.A. Horton, Royal Navy, chief engineer of the Discovery II at the time of the survey.
