= Julio Ruelas =

Mexican artist

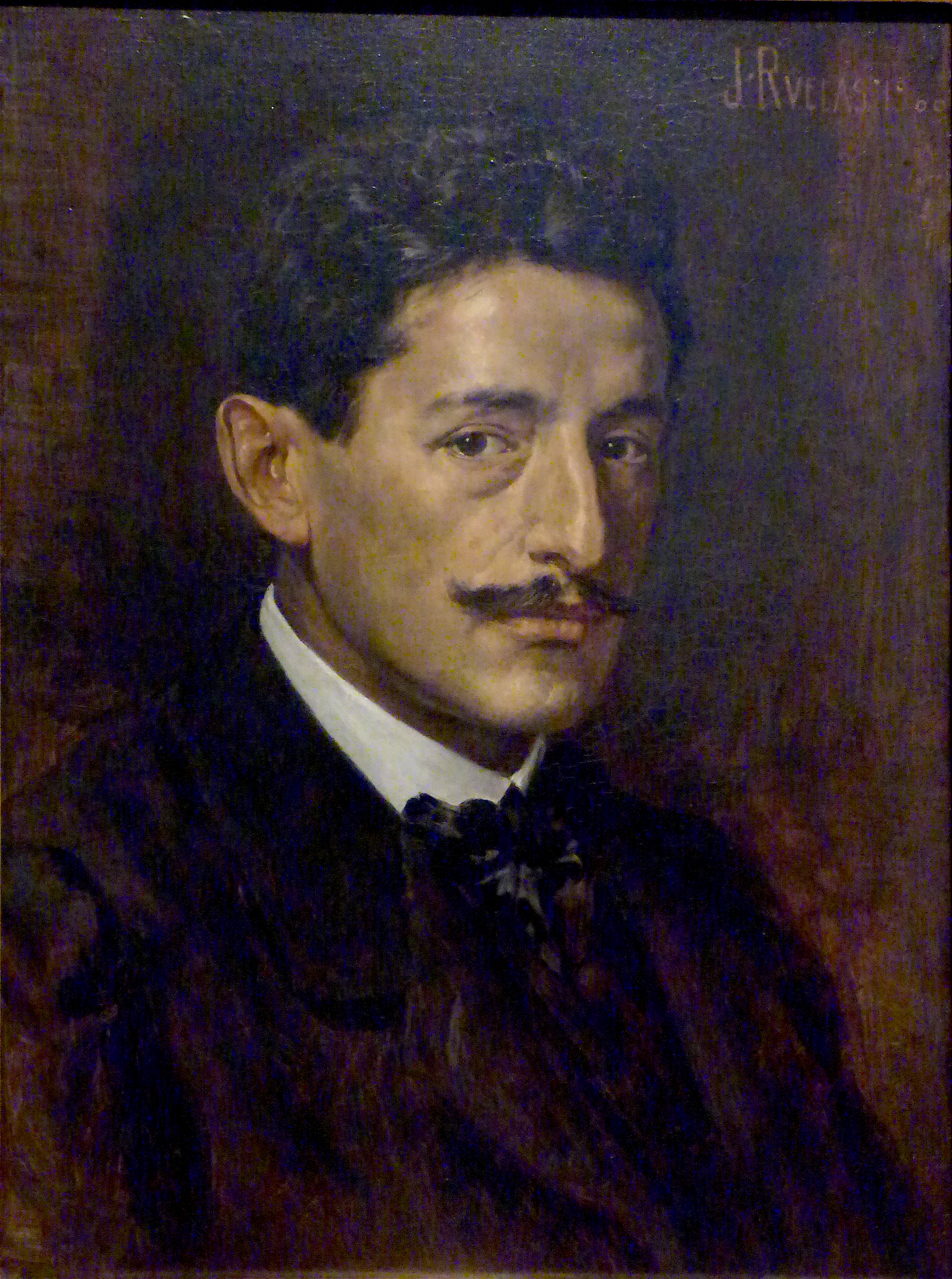
Julio Ruelas

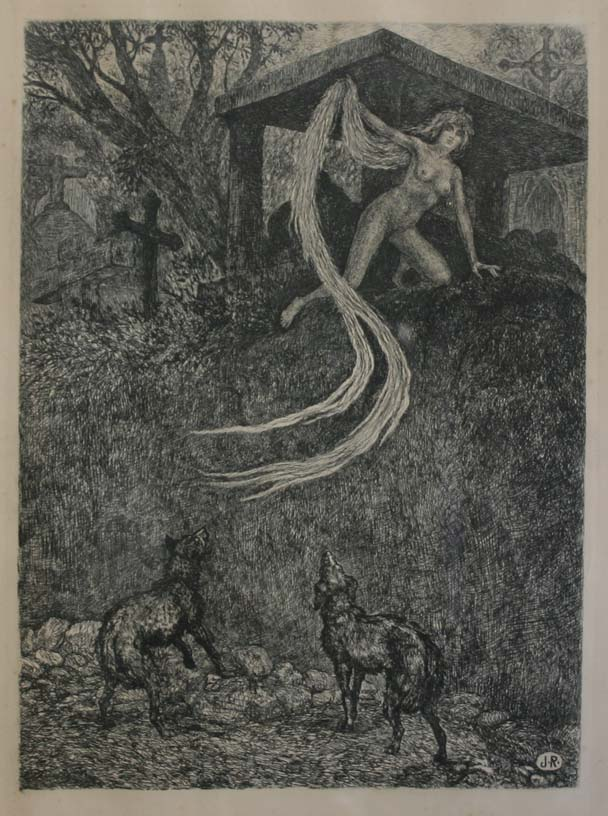
Los fuegos fatuos

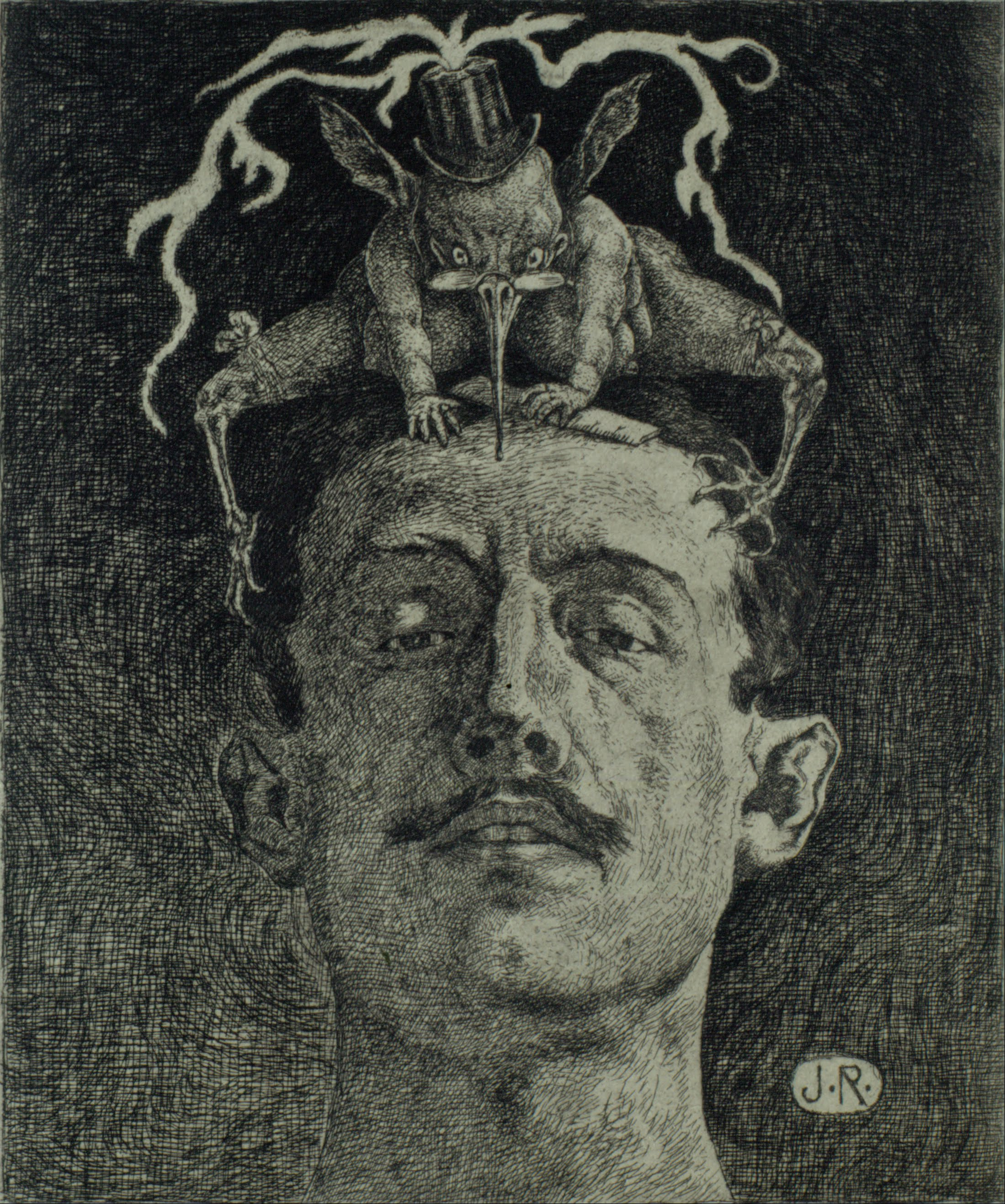
Crítica

Julio Ruelas (June 21, 1870 – September 16, 1907) was a Mexican graphic artist, painter, draughtsman and printmaker. Ruelas was the principal illustrator of the Revista Moderna magazine and is most associated with Mexican symbolism. A number of his works are on display at the Museum of the City of Mexico and in the Zacatecas museum. Artistically, he was noted for creating etched images depicting his own face, incorporating black, twisted lines to give an impression of being tormented.

Born in Zacatecas, he lived in Mexico City from 1876, later attending the Colegio Militar and the Escuela de Bellas Artes. Around 1892, he departed and headed for Karlsruhe, Germany, where Romanticism would profoundly influence his drawings and prints, the most important element of his work as an artist. He also studied under the academic painter Meyerbeer in Danzig.

Ruelas returned to Mexico in 1895 but spent the last three years of his life in Paris, where he died from tuberculosis on September 16, 1907.

== Notable works ==
- El suplicio de la Reina Mora
- La domadora (1897)
- Retrato de Rubén Campos
- El rapto (1901)
- Antón (1901)
- A la sombra de un hermes (1901)
- Autorretrato con musa (1903)
- Confiteor (1903)
- Elfumios (1987)
- Fauno tocando la flauta (1903)
- Efluvios (1903)
- Doncella sobre ave gigante (1903)
- En el país de los gigantes (1904)
- Romance en el país de los enanos (1904)
- Mujer alacrán (1904)
- En el país de los enanos (1905)
- Auto de fé (1906)
- Buitre herido (1906)
- Los fuegos fatuos (ca. 1907)
- La mendiga
- La escalera del dragón
- Esfinge
- La princesa cautiva
- La muerte llegó de improviso
