= Jeff Klinkenberg =

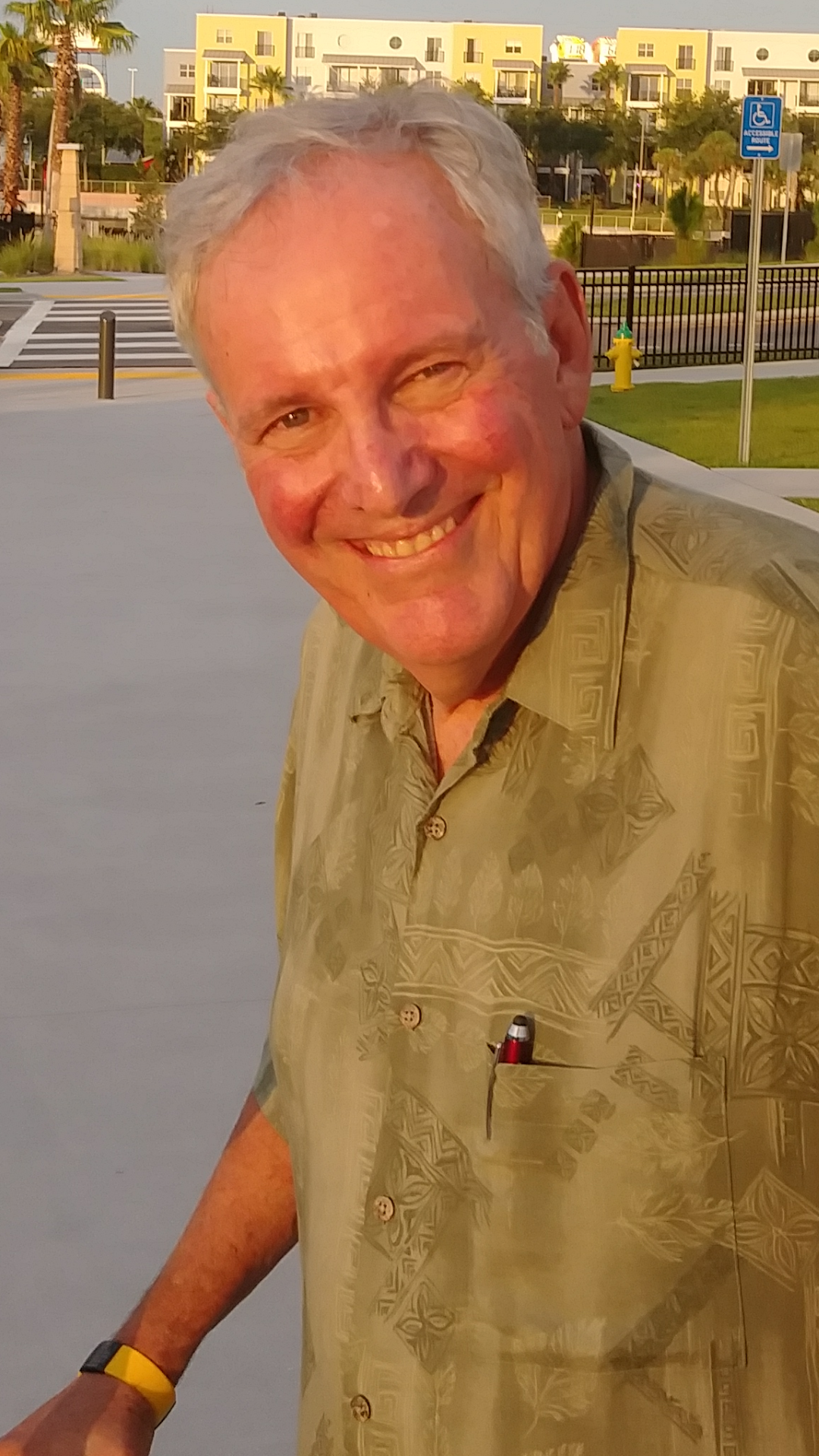
Jeff Klinkenberg

Jeff Klinkenberg is an author who covered Florida culture for newspapers that included The Tampa Bay Times. In 2018 he won the Florida Humanities Council's "Florida Lifetime Achievement Award for Writing," joining previous recipients, the novelists Carl Hiaasen and Patrick Smith. In 2018, the state of Florida gave him its "Heritage Award" for his Florida essays, joining previous recipients Marjory Kinnan Rawlings and Zora Neale Hurston. Klinkenberg's books include Dispatches from the Land of Flowers, Seasons of Real Florida, Pilgrim in the Land of Alligators and Alligators in B-Flat. In 2018 University Press of Florida published Son of Real Florida: Stories From My Life. His writings have also been published in other anthologies.

Klinkenberg was born in Chicago on June 26, 1949. His parents moved to Miami in 1951. He attended St. Rose of Lima Elementary, Archbishop Curley High School and graduated from Miami Edison High School in 1967. He spent much of his youth fishing in the Everglades, the Florida Keys and Miami's Biscayne Bay. He spent two years at Miami-Dade Junior College and graduated from the University of Florida in 1971. In 2009 he was named "an "Alumnus of Distinction" from UF's journalism college. He worked at The Miami News before moving to the former St. Petersburg Times in 1977. He retired in 2013 to write magazine stories, author books, and lecture throughout Florida on subjects related to culture.

In his column, known as "Real Florida," he interviewed and wrote about Marjory Stoneman Douglas and the artist who developed the famous Coppertone sign. He has also written about many other Florida related subjects such as Chesty Morgan, The Highwaymen, Florida panthers, alligators, and snakes.

Klinkenberg has given lectures on his favorite Florida related books in cities across the state.

Klinkenberg, who lives in St. Petersburg, Florida and Waynesville, North Carolina, is married to the former Susan King. Between them they have four children.
