= Phyllis Moen =

American sociologist

- Born: October 27, 1942 (age 83)
- Spouses: Dick Shore; Arnold Moen

Academic background
- Education: BS, Social Science, 1971, MA, Sociology, 1973, University of North Dakota; PhD, 1978, University of Minnesota
- Thesis: Family impacts of the 1975 recession: unemployment among families with children (1978)

Academic work
- Institutions: University of Minnesota; Cornell University

Phyllis Moen (nee Elkins; born October 27, 1942) is an American sociologist. She is the McKnight Presidential Chair in Sociology at the University of Minnesota, and was previously the Ferris Family Professor of Life Course Studies at Cornell University. While at Cornell she founded the Bronfenbrenner Life Course Center, as well as the Cornell Careers Institute, an Alfred P. Sloan Working Families Center.

== Early life and education ==
Moen was born on October 27, 1942. She earned her Bachelor of Science and master's degree from the University of North Dakota and her PhD from the University of Minnesota.

== Career ==
=== Cornell ===
Upon completing her PhD, Moen accepted a faculty position at Cornell University. She was appointed the Ferris Family Professor of Life Course Studies and also the director of the Bronfenbrenner Life Course Center. In this role, she published Women's Two Roles: A Contemporary Dilemma which focused on issues surrounding new parents re-entering the workforce. In 1996, Cornell opened the Cornell Employment and Family Careers Institute which she also directed. Moen was then appointed the director of the Cornell Retirement and Well-Being Study which "examined the latest research and trends in volunteerism and how life-course factors affect volunteering." This led to the publication of her co-authored book The State of Americans: This Generation and the Next in 1996 and A Nation Divided: Diversity, Inequality and Community in American Society.

In 2000, Moen accepted a fellowship at the Harvard University's Radcliffe Institute for Advanced Study for one year. During her fellowship, she researched dual-earner couples, investigating the simultaneous and shifting relationships among "his" career, "her" career, and their "family" career. Moen also "focused on the economic, social, and psychological consequences of various career trajectories and family strategies in light of the existing policies and practices of work organizations and communities."

Her research accumulated into two books in 2003; It's About Time: Couples and Careers and Residential Choices and Experiences of Older Adults: Pathways to Life Quality. The first book she co-edited was based on the Cornell Couples and Careers Study which found that most two-career couples faced numerous stressors in their lives as the current Breadwinner model assumed there was a full-time homemaker at home. Her following book was a joint project with John Krout of Ithaca College's Gerontology Institute that detailed the results of a six-year longitudinal study that began in 1997.

=== University of Minnesota ===
Moen left Cornell University in 2003 to accept the McKnight Presidential Chair in Sociology at the University of Minnesota. While there, she partnered with Erin L. Kelly to study a new workplace flexibility initiative called ROWE (Results Only Work Environment). The goal was to understand the ways this initiative affected employees' productivity and life quality, as well as the health and well-being of their family members.

As a result of her academic work, Moen received numerous accolades in 2015. To begin the year, she was elected President of the Work and Family Researchers Network (WFRN) and invited to be a fellow at the Center for Advanced Study in the Behavioral Sciences at Stanford University. Later that year, Moen was the recipient of the Dean's Medal for her excellence in scholarship and creativity activity. Nearing the end of her first term as President of the WFRN, her co-authored paper "Changing Work and Work-Family Conflict Evidence from the Work, Family, and Health Network" received 2015 Rosabeth Moss Kanter Award for Excellence in Work-Family Research. Two years later, Moen was recognized by AARP Minnesota and Pollen Midwest as one of 2017's “50 over 50”, a list of fifty of the most "inspiring and accomplished leaders from across Minnesota."

During the COVID-19 pandemic in North America, Moen was the recipient of the WFRN Lifetime Achievement Award for her "enduring contributions to the work-family community."

== Personal life ==
Moen was married to the late Dick Shore, who was a U.S. Department of Labor employee and a teacher. She was formerly married to Arnold Moen and they had two daughters together.
