= Phyllis (ship) =

Phyllis (or Phillis) was a British transport noted for having been wrecked near the Burin Peninsula on the south coast of Newfoundland, and for the subsequent survival under brutal conditions and rescue of many of her passengers and crew.

Phyllis set sail from Gravesend, England, in August 1795 en route to Quebec with a detachment of soldiers and their families, under the command of Lieutenant (later General Sir) Howard Douglas.

The ship ran aground in October 1795 just off a rocky beach, but the seas were so rough that several attempts to make it ashore resulted in the death of the swimmers. During the first day and night following the wreck, all of the children and all but one of the women on board were swept from the deck by the waves and drowned. The next day, a raft was built with a rope was secured to the bow and taken ashore, and the survivors made it off the ship just before she sank. The lone remaining woman died the next morning. Some provisions washed ashore, but the sailors refused to follow the orders of their captain and attempted to horde them. Douglas managed to maintain control over his men, and they marched inland in an attempt to find a settlement, but after a few days had to return to the beach. Several days later, on the brink of starvation and freezing to death, the survivors were rescued by a small schooner and taken to the fishing village of Great Jervis, where they spent the winter.

Immediately upon arriving in Halifax, Nova Scotia in April, 1796, Douglas was invited to dinner by Prince Edward, to whom he related the story of the shipwreck and rescue.

== See also ==
- List of shipwrecks
