= 12th century BC =

One hundred years, from 1200 BCE to 1101 BCE

The 12th century BCE is the period from 1200 to 1101 BCE. The Late Bronze Age collapse in the ancient Near East and eastern Mediterranean is often considered to begin in this century.

== Events ==
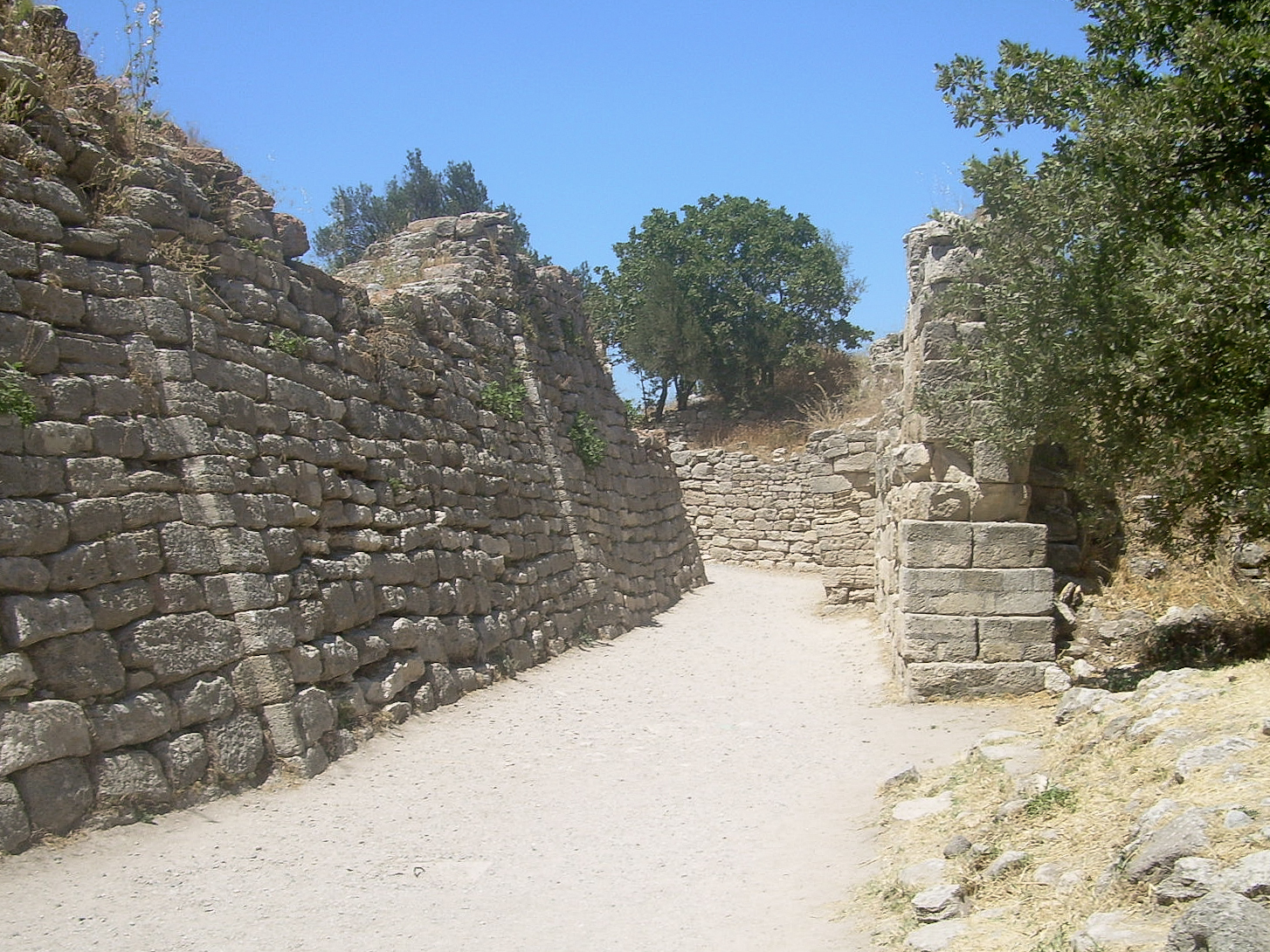
Walls of the excavated city of Troy, supposed center of the legendary Trojan War

- 1200 BC: the first civilization in Central and North America develops in about 1200 BCE in the coastal regions of the southern part of the Gulf of Mexico. Known as the Olmec civilization, its early site is at San Lorenzo.
- 1200 BC: the Phoenicians found the port of Lisbon, Portugal
- 1197 BC: the beginning of the first period (1197 BC–982 BC) by Shao Yong's concept of the I Ching and history.
- c. 1194 BC: the beginning of the legendary Trojan War.
- 1192 BC: Wu Ding, King of the Shang dynasty, dies.
- 1191 BC: Menestheus, legendary King of Athens, dies during the Trojan War after a reign of 23 years and is succeeded by his nephew Demophon, a son of Theseus. Other accounts place his death a decade later and shortly after the Trojan War (see 1180s BC).
- 1186 BC: end of the Nineteenth Dynasty of Egypt, start of the Twentieth Dynasty.
- April 24, 1184 BCE: traditional date for the fall of Troy, Asia Minor to the Mycenaeans and their allies. This marks the end of the Trojan War of Greek mythology.
- 1181 BC: Menestheus, legendary King of Athens and veteran of the Trojan War, dies after a reign of 23 years and is succeeded by his nephew Demophon, a son of Theseus. Other accounts place his death a decade earlier and during the Trojan War (see 1190s BC).
- 1180 BC: the last Kassite King, Anllil-nadin-akhe, is defeated by the Elamites.
- 1180 BC: collapse of Hittite power in Anatolia with the destruction of their capital Hattusa.
- c. 1177 BC: Ramesses III of Egypt repels attacks by northern invaders (the "Sea-Peoples") in the 8th year of his reign (1177 or 1186 BC); an event which Eric Cline closely relates to the beginning of the Late Bronze Age collapse.
- April 16, 1178 BC: a solar eclipse may mark the return of Odysseus, legendary King of Ithaca, to his kingdom after the Trojan War. He discovers a number of suitors competing to marry his wife Penelope, whom they believe to be a widow, in order to succeed him on the throne. He organizes their slaying and re-establishes himself on the throne.
- 1160 BC: death of Pharaoh Ramesses V, from smallpox.
- 1159 BC: the Hekla 3 eruption triggers an 18-year period of climatic cooling.
- 1154 BC: death of exiled Queen Helen of Sparta at Rhodes (estimated date).
- c. 1150 BC: end of Egyptian rule in Canaan, with Ramesses VI the last Pharaoh acknowledged.
- c. 1150 BC: Demophon, legendary King of Athens and veteran of the Trojan War, dies after a reign of 33 years and is succeeded by his son Oxyntes.
- 1137 BC: Ramesses VII begins his reign as the sixth ruler of the Twentieth Dynasty of Egypt.
- c. 1138 BC: Oxyntes, legendary King of Athens, dies after a reign of 12 years and is succeeded by his elder son Apheidas.
- c. 1137 BC: Apheidas, legendary King of Athens, is assassinated and succeeded by his younger brother Thymoetes after a reign of 1 year.
- c. 1128 BC: Thymoetes, legendary King of Athens, dies childless after a reign of 8 years. He is succeeded by his designated heir Melanthus of Pylos, a fifth-generation descendant of Neleus who had reportedly assisted him in battle against the Boeotians.
- 1122 BC: legendary founding date of the city of Pyongyang.
- c. 1120 BC: Troy VIIb_{1} is destroyed.
- 1115 BC: Tiglath-Pileser I becomes King of Assyria.
- 1107 BC: Pharaoh Ramesses X of Egypt dies and is succeeded by Ramesses XI, probably his son, as 10th and final pharaoh of the Twentieth Dynasty of Egypt and last ruler of the New Kingdom of Egypt.
- c. 1104 BCE: Cádiz (Gadir) founded by Phoenicians in southwestern Spain.
- 1100 BC: Tiglath-Pileser I of Assyria conquers the Hittites.
- c. 1100 BC: the Dorians supposedly invade Greece.
- c. 1100 BC: beginning of the proto-Villanovan culture in northern Italy.
- c. 1100 BC: Mycenaean civilization ends. Start of Greek Dark Ages.
- Elamite invaders loot art treasures from Mesopotamia and carry them into Susa.
- Approximate date: Fang ding, from Tomb 1004, Houjiazhuang, Anyang, Henan (Shang dynasty) is made.

== Inventions, discoveries, introductions ==
- c. 1200 BCE — Israelite highland settlement
- 1100s BC — Alphabet, developed by the Phoenicians

== Sovereign states ==
See: List of sovereign states in the 12th century BC
