= Timeline of Italian history =

This is a timeline of Italian history, comprising important legal and territorial changes and political events in Italy and its predecessor states, including Ancient Rome and Prehistoric Italy. Date of the prehistoric era are approximate. For further background, see history of Italy and list of prime ministers of Italy.

== Paleolithic ==
Year	Date	Event
850000 BC		Oldest human habitation is discovered in Italy at Monte Poggiolo.
50000 BC		Neanderthal presence in Italy.
33000 BC		Paglicci 33 is discovered in Italy, the earliest evidence of Haplogroup I-M170.
12000 BC		Villabruna 1 is discovered in Italy, the earliest evidence of Haplogroup R1b.

== 6th millennium BC ==
Year	Date	Event
6000 BC		Neolithic Italy begins with the spread of Cardium pottery.

== 4th millennium BC ==
Year	Date	Event
3345 BC		Otzi is born.
3300 BC		Otzi is killed.

== 3rd millennium BC ==
Year	Date	Event
3000 BC		Remedello culture. This is the first evidence of copper use in Italy.
3000 BC		The Rinaldone culture appears.

== 2nd millennium BC ==
Year	Date	Event
1800 BC		Nuragic civilization in Sardinia.
1700 BC		Terramare culture. Recent archeology, along with ancient Greek accounts, links this culture to the Etruscans.
1500 BC		Apennine culture.
1300 BC		Canegrate culture.
1200 BC		Proto-Villanovan culture appears in Italy. It is likely a southern extension of the Urnfield culture. This is possibly the introduction of Italic peoples into the peninsula.
1194 BC		According to tradition, the beginning of the Trojan War.
1184 BC		According to tradition, the end of the Trojan War and the beginning of the Trojan hero Aeneas's journey when he escaped the Greeks with others in search of a new land.
1181 BC		According to legend, Aeneas lands in Italy, marries Lavinia, the daughter of Latinus, king of the Latins.
1151 BC		Alba Longa is founded. According to legend, Alba Longa was founded by Ascanius, the son of Aeneas.

== 8th century BC ==
Year	Date	Event
800 BC		Etruscan civilization. First evidence of Old Italic script.
753 BC	21 April	Rome was founded. According to Roman legend, Romulus was the founder and first king of Rome, beginning the Roman Kingdom.
720 BC		The first Greek colony of Magna Graecia in mainland Italy, Kyme, is founded.
715 BC		Numa Pompilius became the second King of Rome.
706 BC		Spartan immigrants found the colony of Taranto in Magna Graecia, Southern Italy.

== 7th century BC ==
Year	Date	Event
673 BC		Tullus Hostilius became the third King of Rome.
667 BC		Byzantium was founded by Megarian colonists.
642 BC		Tullus Hostilius died.
642 BC		The Curiate Assembly, one of the legislative assemblies of the Roman Kingdom, elected Ancus Marcius King of Rome.
630 BC		The lyric poet Stesichorus is born in Calabria in Southern Italy.
617 BC		Ancus Marcius died.
616 BC		The Curiate Assembly elected Lucius Tarquinius Priscus King of Rome.

== 6th century BC ==
Year	Date	Event
579 BC		Lucius Tarquinius Priscus was killed in a riot instigated by the sons of Ancus Marcius.
575 BC		The Senate accepted the regent Servius Tullius as king of Rome.
540 BC		The Ancient Greek city of Elea is founded in Southern Italy.
535 BC		Servius Tullius was murdered by his daughter Tullia Minor and her husband Lucius Tarquinius Superbus, who declared himself King of Rome on the steps of the Curia Hostilia.
509 BC		The patrician Lucretia was raped by Lucius Tarquinius Superbus's son Sextus Tarquinius.
509 BC		Overthrow of the Roman monarchy: Following Lucretia's suicide, Lucius Junius Brutus called the Curiate Assembly, one of the legislative assemblies of the Roman Kingdom who agreed to the overthrow and expulsion of Lucius Tarquinius Superbus and to a provisional constitution.
509 BC		Battle of Silva Arsia: Tarquinian and Veientine forces loyal to Lucius Tarquinius Superbus were defeated in the Silva Arsia by a Roman army. Lucius Junius Brutus was killed. Publius Valerius Publicola, returning to Rome with the spoils of war, was awarded the first Roman Triumph on 1 March.
509 BC		The consul Publius Valerius Publicola promulgated a number of liberal reforms, including opening the office of consul to all Roman citizens and placing the treasury under the administration of appointed quaestors.
509 BC	13 September	The Temple of Jupiter Optimus Maximus was ceremonially dedicated to the Capitoline Triad.
508 BC		Roman–Etruscan Wars: A Clusian army failed to conquer Rome.
501 BC		In the face of a potential Sabine invasion, the Senate passed a senatus consultum authorizing the consuls to appoint a dictator, a magistrate who held absolute power during a national emergency. The dictator would in turn appoint the Magister equitum, the commander of the cavalry. The consuls Titus Larcius and Postumus Cominius Auruncus selected the former as dictator.

== 5th century BC ==
Year	Date	Event
496 BC		Battle of Lake Regillus: Latin League invasion near modern Frascati which sought to reinstall Lucius Tarquinius Superbus.
494 BC		First secessio plebis: Lucius Sicinius Vellutus, the plebs abandoned Rome for the nearby Monte Sacro.
474 BC		The Battle of Cumae occurs, resulting in a Siracusani and Cumaea victory against the Etruscans and ending Etruscan expansion in Southern Italy.
471 BC		After a law allowing organization of the plebs tribe, the Plebeian Council was reorganized by tribes rather than curiae.
459 BC		Under popular pressure, the Senate increased the tribunes of the plebs from two to ten.
458 BC		During the first dictatorship of Cincinnatus, the Aequians staged an offensive, breaking a truce. Cincinnatus defeated the Aquians at the Battle of Mount Algidus and after a triumph, returned to his farm after sixteen days.
449 BC		Resolutions of the Plebeian Council were given the full force of law subject to Senate veto.
449 BC		The second of two decemviri, specially-elected ten man commissions, issued the last of the Twelve Tables, the fundamental laws of the Republic.
447 BC		The Tribal Assembly was established, and granted the right to elect quaestors.
445 BC		Marriage between patricians and plebeians was legalized.
443 BC		The offices of the Tribuni militum consulari potestate were established. A collegium of three patrician or plebeian tribunes, one each from specific Roman tribes (the Titienses, the Ramnenses, and the Luceres), would hold the power of the consuls from year to year, subject to the Senate.
443 BC		The office of the censor, a patrician magistrate responsible for conducting the census in years without a consul, was established.
439 BC		Cincinnatus accepted second dictatorship to prevent Spurius Maelius from seizing power; the patricians suspected Spurius of plotting to set himself up as a king. Gaius Servilius Ahala was appointed magister equitum and slew Maelius. Cincinnatus again resigned his dictatorship and returned to his farm after 21 days.
435 BC		Fidenae, an important trade post on the Tiber, was captured from the Veii.
408 BC		The Tribuni militum consulari potestate held office.

== 4th century BC ==
Year	Date	Event
396 BC		Battle of Veii: Roman forces led by the dictator Marcus Furius Camillus conquered Veii.
396 BC		Roman soldiers first earned a salary ("salary" from Latin for "salt").
394 BC		The consuls held office.
391 BC		The Tribuni militum consulari potestate held office.
390 BC	18 July	Battle of the Allia: The Senones routed a Roman force at the confluence of the rivers Allia and Tiber.
390 BC		The Senones sacked Rome.
367 BC		The consuls held office.
366 BC		Lucius Sextius was elected the first plebeian consul.
366 BC		The office of Praetor, which took the judiciary responsibilities of the consul and could be held only by a patrician, was established.
351 BC		The first plebeian dictator was elected.
351 BC		The first plebeian censor was elected.
343 BC		Samnite Wars: Rome marched against the Samnites, probably after an appeal from the Campanians.
343 BC		Battle of Mount Gaurus: A Samnite force was routed by a Roman army near Mount Barbaro.
342 BC		The Leges Genuciae were passed, banning a person from holding two offices at the same time, or during any ten-year period; charging interest on loans was also banned.
341 BC		Samnite Wars: The Senate agreed a peace, following an appeal by the Samnite to a previous treaty of friendship.
340 BC		Latin War: The Latin League invaded Samnium.
339 BC		A law was passed which required the election of at least three plebeian censor every five years.
338 BC		Latin War: Rome defeated the Latin League armies.
337 BC		The first plebeian Praetor was elected.
328 BC		Samnite Wars: Rome declared war on the Samnites after their failure to prevent their subjects raiding Fregellae.
321 BC		Battle of the Caudine Forks: After being trapped in a mountain pass near Caudium without a water supply, Roman forces were allowed to retreat by a Samnite army.
315 BC		Battle of Lautulae: A decisive Samnite victory near Terracina split Roman territory in two.
311 BC		Samnite Wars: The Etruscans laid siege to Sutri.
310 BC		Battle of Lake Vadimo (310 BC): Rome inflicted a substantial military defeat on the Etruscans at Lake Vadimo.
308 BC		Samnite Wars: The Umbri, Picentes and Marsi joined the Samnites against Rome.
306 BC		The Hernici declared their independence from Rome.
305 BC		Battle of Bovianum: A Roman force destroyed the majority of the Samnite army.
304 BC		Rome conquered the Aequi.
304 BC		Samnite Wars: The treaty of friendship between the Romans and Samnites was restored.
304 BC		The Greek tyrant Agathocles takes the title of king of Sicily.

== 3rd century BC ==
Year	Date	Event
300 BC		The Lex Ogulnia was passed, allowing plebeians to become priests.
298 BC		Samnite Wars: Rome declared war on the Samnites after an appeal by the Lucani.
298 BC		Samnite Wars: Rome captured the Samnite cities of Bojano and Castel di Sangro.
297 BC		Battle of Tifernum: A Roman army defeated a numerically superior Samnite force at Città di Castello.
295 BC		Battle of Sentinum: A Roman army decisively defeated a numerically superior force of Samnites, Etruscans, Umbri and Senones in coalition at Sentinum. The consul Publius Decius Mus (consul 312 BC) was killed.
294 BC		Samnite Wars: Roman and Samnite forces battled at Lucera.
293 BC		Battle of Aquilonia: A Roman army destroyed the majority of Samnite forces, probably in modern Agnone.
293 BC		A census counted about 270,000 residents of Rome.
291 BC		Samnite Wars: Rome conquered and colonized the Samnite city of Venosa.
290 BC		Samnite Wars: The last effective Samnite resistance was eliminated.
289 BC		Agathocles dies, and democracy is restored in Syracuse due to his wish to not have his sons succeed him as king.
287 BC		Conflict of the Orders: A secessio plebis took place.
287 BC		Conflict of the Orders: The Lex Hortensia was passed, ending the power of the Senate to veto resolutions of the Plebeian Council.
283 BC		Battle of Lake Vadimo (283 BC): A Roman army defeated a combined force of Etruscans, Boii and Senones near Lake Vadimo.
281 BC		Taranto appealed to Epirus for aid against Rome.
280 BC		Pyrrhic War: An Epirote army of some 25,000 landed at Taranto.
280 BC	July	Battle of Heraclea: A Greek coalition force led by the Epirote king Pyrrhus of Epirus defeated a Roman army after their deployment of war elephants at Heraclea Lucania.
279 BC		Battle of Asculum: A Greek force led by the Epirote king Pyrrhus defeated a Roman army at modern Ascoli Satriano, despite suffering heavy losses.
275 BC		Battle of Beneventum (275 BC): Roman and Epirote armies met in a bloody battle at Benevento.
272 BC		Pyrrhic War: Pyrrhus withdrew with his army to Epirus.
272 BC		Pyrrhic War: Taranto surrendered to Rome.
267 BC		The number of quaestors was raised from four to ten.
264 BC		Battle of Messana: A Roman force defeated a Carthaginian and Siracusani garrison at Messina.
242 BC		The office of the praetor qui inter peregrinos ius dicit, a Praetor with jurisdiction over foreigners, was created.
241 BC		First Punic War: Sicily was organized as the province of Sicilia.
238 BC		Mercenary War: Carthage surrendered its claims on Sardinia and Corsica to Rome.
229 BC		Illyrian Wars: Rome invaded the territory of the Ardiaei.
228 BC		Illyrian Wars: The Ardiaei surrendered some territory, including strategically significant ports, to Rome, ending the war.
225 BC		Battle of Telamon: A Roman army decisively defeated a Gallic invasion near modern Talamone. The consul Gaius Atilius Regulus was killed.
219 BC		Illyrian Wars: Rome invaded Hvar.
218 BC		Second Punic War: A Carthaginian army departed Cartagena.
218 BC		Illyrian Wars: Demetrius of Pharos fled to Macedonia.
216 BC	2 August	Battle of Cannae: The Carthaginian general Hannibal decisively defeated a numerically superior Roman force at Cannae.
214 BC		First Macedonian War: A Macedonian fleet captured Oricum.
214 BC		Siege of Syracuse (214–212 BC): Rome laid siege to Syracuse.
212 BC		Siege of Syracuse (214–212 BC): Roman forces breached the inner citadel of Syracuse and slaughtered its inhabitants.
205 BC		First Macedonian War: Rome and Macedonia signed the Treaty of Phoenice, according to which Macedonia renounced its alliance with Carthage in exchange for Roman recognition of its gains in Illyria.
205 BC		All the cities of Magna Graecia lost their independence and were annexed to the Roman Republic.
204 BC		Second Punic War: The consul Scipio Africanus landed an invasion fleet at Utica.
202 BC	19 October	Battle of Zama: A Roman army decisively defeated Carthage, probably near modern Sakiet Sidi Youssef.
202 BC		Scipio defeats Hannibal in Africa at the Battle of Zama ending the Second Punic War
201 BC		Second Punic War: Carthage accepted Roman conditions for peace, including disarmament, a war indemnity of ten thousand talents, and the cession of Iberia, ending the war.

== 2nd century BC ==
Year	Date	Event
200 BC		Second Macedonian War: A Roman fleet arrived in Illyria to relieve a Macedonian siege of Abydos.
197 BC		The provinces of Hispania Ulterior and Hispania Citerior were organized.
197 BC		The number of quaestors was increased to twelve.
197 BC		The number of Praetors was increased to six.
196 BC		Second Macedonian War: Macedonia surrendered its conquests in Greece and agreed to pay a war indemnity, ending the war.
192 BC		Roman–Seleucid War: The Seleucid Empire invaded Greece.
188 BC		Roman–Seleucid War: The Seleucid Empire signed the Treaty of Apamea, under which it surrendered all territory west of the Taurus Mountains to the Roman clients Rhodes and Pergamon and agreed to disarm its navy and pay a war indemnity of fifteen thousand talents of silver to Rome.
180 BC		The Lex Villia annalis, which established minimum ages for high office and required a minimum of two years in private life between offices, was passed.
172 BC		Third Macedonian War: Rome declared war on Macedonia.
167 BC		Third Macedonian War: The Macedonian king Perseus of Macedon was captured. Macedonia was divided into four districts subject to Rome.
155 BC		Lusitanian War: The Lusitanians of Hispania Ulterior rebelled against Rome.
150 BC		Fourth Macedonian War: An Andriscus rebelled against Rome, claiming to be Perseus's son and the rightful king of Macedonia.
149 BC		Third Punic War: Rome declared war on Carthage.
149 BC		The Lex Calpurnia was passed, establishing a Praetor-led court to hear appeals against extortionate taxes levied by governors in the provinces.
148 BC		Fourth Macedonian War: Andriscus was surrendered to Rome to be executed.
146 BC		Third Punic War: Roman forces breached the city of Carthage, burned it, and enslaved its surviving inhabitants.
146 BC		Battle of Corinth (146 BC): Roman forces decisively defeated the armies of the Achaean League at Corinth.
146 BC		The province of Macedonia was organized.
146 BC		The province of Africa was organized on captured Carthaginian territory.
139 BC		Lusitanian War: The Lusitanian leader Viriatus was assassinated by his three ambassadors to Rome Audax, Ditalcus and Minurus.
135 BC		The First Servile War, an unsuccessful slave revolt against the Roman Republic, begins.
133 BC		The Tribune of the Plebs Tiberius Gracchus was beaten to death by a mob of senators led by the Pontifex Maximus Publius Cornelius Scipio Nasica Serapio (consul 138 BC).
121 BC		The province of Gallia Narbonensis was organized.
121 BC		The first Senatus consultum ultimum was passed, granting the consul Lucius Opimius emergency powers to defeat the partisans of Gaius Gracchus.
112 BC		Jugurthine War: Rome declared war on Numidia.
107 BC		Gaius Marius was elected consul.
106 BC		Marius was reelected consul.
106 BC		Jugurthine War: The Numidian king Jugurtha was imprisoned in the Mamertine Prison.
105 BC	6 October	Battle of Arausio: A coalition of the Cimbri and Teutons inflicted a serious defeat on the Roman army at modern Orange. Some hundred thousand Roman soldiers were killed.
104 BC		Marius was elected consul for the first of three years in a row.
104 BC		The Second Servile War, another failed slave rebellion against the Romans, begins.
102 BC		Battle of Aquae Sextiae: Rome decisively defeated the forces of the Teutons and Ambrones and killed some ninety thousand soldiers and civilians.
101 BC		Battle of Vercellae: An invasion of Italy by the Cimbri was decisively defeated by a numerically inferior Roman force. Some hundred thousand Cimbri soldiers and civilians were killed along with their king Boiorix.

== 1st century BC (needs editing) ==
Year	Date	Event
100 BC		Julius Caesar is born.
100 BC		Marius was elected consul.
100 BC	10 December	Assassin hired by Lucius Appuleius Saturninus and Gaius Servilius Glaucia beat to death Gaius Memmius, a candidate for the consulship.
91 BC		The assassination of a tribune named Marcus Livius Drusus helps spark the Marsic War.
91 BC		Social War (91–88 BC): The Roman clients in Italy the Marsi, the Paeligni, the Vestini, the Marrucini, the Picentes, the Fretani, the Hirpini, the Iapyges, Pompeii, Venosa, Lucania and Samnium rebelled against Rome.
88 BC		The Marsic War ends in a Roman military victory, though the rest of Italians were granted rights.
88 BC		The Roman consul Sulla led an army of his partisans across the pomerium into Rome.
88 BC		Social War (91–88 BC): The war started.
87 BC		First Mithridatic War: Roman forces landed at Epirus.
85 BC		First Mithridatic War: A peace was agreed between Rome and Pontus under which the latter returned to its prewar borders.
83 BC		Sulla's civil war: Sulla landed with an army at Brindisi.
83 BC		Second Mithridatic War: The Roman general Lucius Licinius Murena invaded Pontus.
82 BC		Sulla's civil war: Sulla was declared dictator.
81 BC		Second Mithridatic War: Murena withdrew from Pontus.
80 BC		Sertorian War: Quintus Sertorius landed on the Iberian Peninsula in support of a Lusitanian rebellion.
73 BC		The Third Servile War begins; one of the participants is the famous Thracian gladiator known as Spartacus.
73 BC		Third Mithridatic War: Pontus invaded Bithynia.
73 BC		Third Servile War: Some seventy gladiators, slaves of Lentulus Batiatus in Capua, made a violent escape.
72 BC		Sertorian War: Marcus Perpenna Vento, by now the leader of the Romans in revolt in Iberia, was executed by the general Pompey.
71 BC		Like the other Servile Wars, the Third Servile War ends in a Roman victory against the uprising slaves.
71 BC		Third Servile War: The slaves in rebellion were decisively defeated by Roman forces near Petelia. Their leader Spartacus was killed.
66 BC		The last of the Cilician pirates were wiped out by Pompey.
63 BC		Third Mithridatic War: Defeated, the Pontic king Mithridates VI of Pontus ordered his friend and bodyguard to kill him.
63 BC		Siege of Jerusalem (63 BC): Pompey conquered Jerusalem and entered the Holy of Holies of the Second Temple.
63 BC		Cicero was elected consul.
63 BC		Second Catilinarian conspiracy: A conspiracy led by the senator Catiline to overthrow the Republic was exposed before the Senate. The five conspirators present were summarily executed in the Mamertine Prison.
59 BC		Pompey joined a political alliance, the so-called First Triumvirate, with the consul Julius Caesar and the censor Marcus Licinius Crassus.
58 BC		Gallic Wars: Roman forces barred the westward migration of the Helvetii across the Rhône.
53 BC	6 May	Battle of Carrhae: A Parthian army decisively defeated a numerically superior Roman invasion force near Harran. Crassus was killed.
50 BC		Gallic Wars: The last Gaulish rebels were defeated.
49 BC	10 January	Caesar's Civil War: Caesar illegally crossed the Rubicon into Italy with his army.
48 BC	4 January	Caesar's Civil War: Caesar landed at Durrës in pursuit of Pompey and his partisans the optimates.
46 BC	November	Caesar left Africa for Iberia in pursuit of Pompey's sons Gnaeus Pompeius (son of Pompey the Great) and Sextus Pompey.
44 BC	15 March	Assassination of Julius Caesar: Caesar was assassinated in the Theatre of Pompey by a conspiracy of senators.
44 BC	15 March, Ides of March	Julius Caesar is assassinated.
43 BC	27 November	The Lex Titia was passed, granting the Second Triumvirate of Augustus, Mark Antony and Marcus Aemilius Lepidus (triumvir) the power to make and annul laws and appoint magistrates.
42 BC		Liberators' civil war: Augustus and Antony led some thirty legions to northern Greece in pursuit of Caesar's assassins Marcus Junius Brutus the Younger and Gaius Cassius Longinus.
42 BC	23 October	Liberators' civil war: Brutus committed suicide after being defeated in battle.
33 BC		Antony's Parthian War: A campaign led by Antony against the Parthian Empire ended in failure.
33 BC		The Second Triumvirate expired.
31 BC	2 September	Battle of Actium: Forces loyal to Augustus defeated Antony and his lover Cleopatra, queen of Egypt, in a naval battle near Actium.
30 BC	1 August	Final War of the Roman Republic: Antony's forces defected to Augustus. He committed suicide.
30 BC	30 August	Cleopatra committed suicide, probably in Roman custody and by snakebite.
30 BC		The province of Egypt was organized. Augustus took the title pharaoh.
29 BC		Moesia was annexed to Rome.
29 BC		Cantabrian Wars: Rome deployed some eighty thousand soldiers against the Cantabri in Iberia.
27 BC	16 January	The Senate granted Augustus the titles augustus, majestic, and princeps, first.
25 BC		Augustus indicated his nephew Marcus Claudius Marcellus (Julio-Claudian dynasty) as his chosen successor by marrying him to his only daughter Julia the Elder.
25 BC		The Roman client Amyntas of Galatia died. Augustus organized his territory as the province of Galatia.
24 BC		Augustus' campaigns against the Cantabrians in Hispania Tarraconensis, the Cantabrian Wars, ended.
23 BC		Coinage reform of Augustus: Augustus centralized the minting of and reformed the composition and value of the Roman currency.
23 BC		Marcellus died.
21 BC		Augustus married Julia to his general Marcus Vipsanius Agrippa.
19 BC		Cantabrian Wars: The last major combat operations ended. The Cantabri and Astures were pacified.
17 BC		Augustus adopted the sons of Agrippa and Julia, his grandsons Gaius Caesar and Lucius Caesar, as his own sons.
16 BC		Raetia and Noricum were conquered and annexed to Rome.
12 BC		Germanic Wars: Roman forces crossed the Rhine into Germania.
12 BC		Agrippa died of fever.
11 BC		Augustus married Julia to his general and stepson Tiberius.
9 BC		The Roman general Nero Claudius Drusus died from injuries sustained falling from a horse.
9 BC		Pannonia was annexed and incorporated into Illyricum.
6 BC		Augustus offered Tiberius tribunician power and imperium over the eastern half of the Empire. Tiberius refused, announcing his retirement to Hodson.
2 BC		Augustus was acclaimed Pater Patriae, father of the country, by the Senate.
2 BC		Augustus convicted Julia of adultery and treason, annulled her marriage to Tiberius, and exiled her with her mother Scribonia to Ventotene.

== 1st century ==
Year	Date	Event
	2 August	Lucius Caesar died of a sudden illness.
		Augustus allowed Tiberius to return to Rome as a private citizen.
	21 February	Gaius Caesar died in Lycia from wounds suffered in battle.
		Augustus adopted Tiberius as his son and granted him tribunician power.
		Augustus deposed Herod Archelaus, ethnarch in Samaria, Judea and Idumea, and organized the province of Judea on his territories.
		Bellum Batonianum: The Daesitiates, an Illyrian people, rose up against Roman authority in Illyricum.
		Bellum Batonianum: The Daesitiate chieftain Bato (Daesitiate chieftain) surrendered to Roman forces.
	September	Battle of the Teutoburg Forest: A coalition of Germanic forces ambushed and destroyed three Roman legions in the Teutoburg Forest. Publius Quinctilius Varus, the commander of Roman forces in Germania, committed suicide.
AD 10		Tiberius assumed command of Roman forces in Germania.
AD 10		Illyricum was divided into the provinces of Pannonia and Dalmatia.
AD 13		Tiberius was granted power equal to Augustus as co-princeps.
AD 14	19 August	Augustus died.
AD 14		Germanicus, son of Nero Claudius Drusus and adoptive son of Tiberius, was appointed commander of Roman forces in Germania.
AD 14		Germanicus and Tiberius's natural son Drusus Julius Caesar were sent to suppress mutinies in Germania and Pannonia, respectively.
AD 15		Lucius Seius Strabo was appointed governor of Egypt. His son Sejanus remained as the sole prefect of the Praetorian Guard.
AD 16		Battle of the Weser River: A Roman army led by Germanicus decisively defeated a Germanic force on the Weser.
AD 17		Archelaus of Cappadocia, king in Cappadocia and a Roman client, died. Tiberius annexed his territory, organizing it as the province of Cappadocia.
AD 17		Antiochus III of Commagene, king of Commagene and a Roman client, died. Tiberius annexed his territory to the province of Syria.
AD 18		Tiberius granted Germanicus imperium over the eastern half of the Empire.
AD 19	10 October	Germanicus died in Antioch, possibly after being poisoned on Tiberius's orders.
AD 22		Tiberius granted Drusus Julius Caesar tribunician power, marking him as his choice as successor.
AD 23	14 September	Drusus Julius Caesar died, possibly after being poisoned by Sejanus or his wife Livilla.
AD 26		Tiberius retired to Capri, leaving Sejanus in control of Rome through his office.
AD 28		The Frisii hanged their Roman tax collectors and expelled the governor.
AD 29		Livia, Augustus's widow and Tiberius's mother, died.
AD 31	18 October	Sejanus was executed on Tiberius's orders.
AD 31		Tiberius invited Germanicus's son Caligula to join him on Capri.
AD 37	16 March	Tiberius died. His will left his offices jointly to Caligula and Drusus Julius Caesar's son, his grandson Tiberius Gemellus.
AD 38		Tiberius Gemellus was murdered on Caligula's orders.
AD 40		Ptolemy of Mauretania, king of Mauretania and a Roman client, was murdered on Caligula's orders during a state visit to Rome. His slave Aedemon rose in revolt against Roman rule.
AD 41		The general Gaius Suetonius Paulinus was appointed to suppress the rebellion in Mauretania.
AD 41	24 January	Caligula was assassinated by the centurion Cassius Chaerea.
AD 41	24 January	The Praetorian Guard acclaimed Nero Claudius Drusus's son Claudius princeps.
AD 41		Claudius restored the Judean monarchy under king Herod Agrippa.
AD 42		The territory of the former Mauretania was organized into the provinces of Mauretania Caesariensis and Mauretania Tingitana.
AD 43		Roman conquest of Britain: The senator Aulus Plautius led four legions into Great Britain in support of king Verica of the Atrebates.
AD 43		Claudius annexed Lycia into the Empire as a province.
AD 46		The Odrysian king Rhoemetalces III, a Roman client, was killed by anti-Roman insurgents.
AD 46		Odrysia was incorporated into the Empire as the province of Thracia.
AD 48		Claudius's wife Messalina was executed for conspiracy.
AD 48		Claudius appointed Herod Agrippa's son Herod Agrippa II king of Judea.
AD 49		Claudius married his niece, Germanicus's daughter Agrippina the Younger.
AD 50		Claudius adopted Agrippina's son Nero as his own son.
AD 54	13 October	Claudius died after being poisoned by Agrippina. Nero succeeded him as princeps.
AD 55	11 February	Claudius's young natural son Britannicus died, probably by poison.
AD 58		Roman–Parthian War of 58–63: Roman forces attacked Armenia in support of their preferred king Tigranes VI of Armenia against the Parthian candidate Tiridates I of Armenia.
AD 59	23 March	Agrippina died, probably murdered by her son Nero.
AD 60		Boudica, a queen of the Iceni, was appointed to lead a revolt of the Iceni and the Trinovantes against Rome.
AD 61		Battle of Watling Street: Some eighty thousand soldiers and civilians among the Iceni and Trinovantes were killed, probably in the modern West Midlands, ending Boudica's revolt.
AD 63		Roman–Parthian War of 58–63: The Roman and Parthian Empires agreed that Tiridates and his descendants would remain kings of Armenia as Roman clients, ending the war.
AD 64	18 July	Great Fire of Rome: A fire began which would cause massive property damage and loss of life over six days in Rome.
AD 64		Nero began construction of his large and extravagant villa the Domus Aurea.
AD 65	19 April	Pisonian conspiracy: Nero was informed of a broad conspiracy to assassinate him and appoint the senator Gaius Calpurnius Piso leader of Rome.
AD 66		First Jewish–Roman War: The Jewish population of Judea revolted against Roman rule.
AD 68	9 June	Nero, then in hiding in the villa of the freedman Phaon (freedman), was notified that the Senate had declared him an enemy of the state and ordered him brought to the Forum to be publicly beaten to death. He ordered his secretary Epaphroditos to kill him.
AD 68	9 June	The Senate accepted Galba, governor of Hispania Tarraconensis, as ruler of Rome.
AD 68		Zealot Temple Siege: The forces of Ananus ben Ananus, the Jewish former High Priest of Israel, laid siege to the Zealots in the Second Temple.
AD 69	15 January	The Praetorian Guard assassinated Galba and acclaimed Otho ruler of Rome.
AD 69	16 April	Following his defeat by Vitellius, the commander of the Roman army on the lower Rhine, near modern Calvatone, and to prevent further civil war, Otho committed suicide.
AD 69		Revolt of the Batavi: Gaius Julius Civilis, commander of the Batavi auxiliaries in the Rhine legions, turned against Rome.
AD 69	December	The Senate recognized Vespasian, the commander of Roman forces in Egypt and Judea, as ruler of Rome.
AD 69	22 December	Vitellius was executed in Rome by troops loyal to Vespasian.
AD 70		Revolt of the Batavi: Following a series of battlefield reversals, Civilis accepted peace terms from the Roman general Quintus Petillius Cerialis.
AD 70	September	Siege of Jerusalem (70 CE): The Roman general Titus breached the walls of Jerusalem, sacked the city and destroyed the Second Temple.
AD 71		Roman conquest of Britain: Roman forces entered modern Scotland.
AD 73	16 April	Siege of Masada: Roman forces breached the walls of Masada, a mountain fortress held by the Jewish extremist sect the Sicarii.
AD 77		Gnaeus Julius Agricola was appointed consul and governor of Britain.
AD 79	23 June	Vespasian died. He was succeeded by his son Titus.
AD 79	24 August	Eruption of Mount Vesuvius in 79: Mount Vesuvius erupted, destroying the cities of Pompeii and Herculaneum. The eruption of Mount Vesuvius spews massive amounts of volcanic gas, ash, and molten rock. Several Roman settlements, including Pompeii and Herculaneum, are annihilated and buried under colossal amounts of ashfall deposits and rock fragments.
AD 80		Rome was partially destroyed by fire.
AD 80	March	The Colosseum was completed.
AD 81	13 September	Titus died of fever. He was succeeded by his younger brother Domitian.
AD 85		Agricola was recalled to Rome.
AD 86		Domitian's Dacian War: The Dacian king Decebalus invaded Moesia.
AD 88		Domitian's Dacian War: Decebalus agreed to return all Roman prisoners of war and accept his status as a Roman client in exchange for an annual subsidy of eight million sestertii, ending the war.
AD 89	1 January	Lucius Antonius Saturninus, governor of Germania Superior, revolted against Domitian's rule.
AD 89		Saturninus was executed.
AD 96	18 September	Domitian was assassinated by members of the royal household.
AD 96	18 September	Nerva was declared ruler of Rome by the Senate.
AD 97		Nerva adopted the general and former consul Trajan as his son.
AD 98	27 January	Nerva died. Trajan succeeded him.

== 2nd century ==
Year	Date	Event
101		First Dacian War: Rome invaded Dacia.
101	September	Second Battle of Tapae: Dacian forces retreated from contact with the Romans at Tapae.
102		First Dacian War: The Dacian king Decebalus reaffirmed his loyalty to Rome, ending the war.
105		Second Dacian War: Trajan responded to the resumption of raids on Roman settlements in Moesia by invading Dacia.
106		Battle of Sarmisegetusa: Roman forces breached the Dacian capital Sarmizegetusa Regia. The Dacian king Decebalus escaped to the east.
106		The Nabatean king Rabbel II Soter died.
106	22 March	Nabatea was annexed to the Roman empire as the province of Arabia Petraea.
106		Second Dacian War: The Dacian king Decebalus committed suicide in his fortification at Ranisstorum to avoid capture.
107		The province of Dacia was organized.
112		Trajan's Forum was inaugurated.
113		Roman–Parthian Wars: Trajan launched an expedition against Parthia.
113		Trajan's Column was erected in Trajan's Forum to commemorate the victory over Dacia.
114		Trajan deposed the Armenian king Parthamasiris of Armenia, a Roman client, and organized the province of Armenia on his territory.
115		Kitos War: The Jews in Cyrene rose up against Roman authority.
116		The provinces of Mesopotamia and Assyria were organized on territory conquered from Parthia.
116		Trajan captured the Parthian capital Ctesiphon and deposed its shah Osroes I in favor of his son Parthamaspates of Parthia.
117		Kitos War: Roman forces captured the rebel stronghold of Lod and executed many of its inhabitants.
117	8 August	Trajan died.
117	10 August	The Senate accepted the general Hadrian as ruler of Rome, following the appearance of documents indicating he had been adopted by Trajan.
117		Osroes I deposed his son Parthamaspates of Parthia and replaced him as shah of Parthia.
118		Hadrian withdrew from the territories of Armenia, Assyria and Mesopotamia, allowing the return of their respective client monarchies.
119		A rebellion took place in Britain.
122		The construction of Hadrian's Wall at the northern border of Britain began.
123		Hadrian arrived in Mauretania to suppress a local revolt.
124		Hadrian travelled to Greece.
126		Hadrian returned to Rome.
126		The rebuilt Pantheon was dedicated to Agrippa, its original builder.
132		Bar Kokhba revolt: Simon bar Kokhba, believed by his followers to be the Messiah, launched a revolt against Roman authority in Judea.
135		Bar Kokhba revolt: The revolt ended at a cost of tens of thousands of Roman soldiers and some six hundred thousand Jewish rebels and civilians, including bar Kokhba, killed. Judea and Syria were combined into the single province of Syria Palaestina.
136		Hadrian adopted Lucius Aelius as his son and successor.
138	1 January	Lucius Aelius died.
138	25 February	Hadrian adopted Antoninus Pius as his son and successor and granted him tribunician power and imperium, on the condition that he in turn adopt Marcus Aurelius and Lucius Verus as his sons.
138	10 July	Hadrian died, probably from heart failure.
138	11 July	Antoninus succeeded Hadrian.
141		Roman conquest of Britain: Roman forces invaded modern Scotland under the command of the British governor Quintus Lollius Urbicus.
142		The construction of the Antonine Wall at the northern border of Britain began.
161	7 March	Antoninus died. He was succeeded by Marcus and Lucius Verus.
161		Roman–Parthian War of 161–166: The Parthian Empire deposed the Armenian king Sohaemus of Armenia, a Roman client, and installed Bakur.
165		Antonine Plague: A pandemic, probably of smallpox or measles, began which would kill some five million people throughout the Roman Empire.
166		Roman–Parthian War of 161–166: Roman forces sacked the Parthian capital Ctesiphon.
169		Lucius Verus died of disease, leaving Marcus the sole ruler of Rome.
169		Marcomannic Wars: A coalition of Germanic tribes led by the Marcomanni invaded the Roman Empire across the Danube.
175		Marcomannic Wars: Rome and the Iazyges signed a treaty under which the latter agreed to return Roman prisoners of war and supply troops to the Auxilia, ending the war.
177		Marcus named his natural son Commodus co-ruler with himself.
180	17 March	Marcus died.
180		Antonine Plague: The pandemic ended.
184		The Antonine Wall was abandoned by Roman forces.
192	31 December	Commodus was strangled to death.
193	1 January	The Praetorian Guard acclaimed the consul Pertinax ruler of Rome at the Castra Praetoria.
193	28 March	Pertinax was assassinated by the Praetorian Guard.
193	28 March	The Praetorian Guard acclaimed the former consul Didius Julianus, who had provided the highest bid, ruler of Rome.
193	9 April	Pescennius Niger, the legatus Augusti pro praetore of Syria Palaestina, was proclaimed ruler of Rome by his legions.
193	14 April	The Legio XIV Gemina acclaimed its commander Septimius Severus ruler of Rome at Carnuntum.
193	May	The Senate recognized Septimius Severus as ruler of Rome and sentenced Julianus to death.
194		Battle of Issus (194): Niger's forces were decisively defeated by the armies of Septimius Severus at Issus.
196		Clodius Albinus, the commander of Roman troops in Britain and Iberia, took the title Imperator Caesar Decimus Clodius Septimius Albinus Augustus.
197	19 February	Battle of Lugdunum: Septimius Severus and Albinus met in battle at Lugdunum.
197	19 February	Albinus committed suicide or was killed.
197		Roman–Parthian Wars: Septimius Severus sacked the Parthian capital Ctesiphon.
198		Septimius Severus appointed his eldest natural son Caracalla co-ruler with himself.

== 3rd century ==
Year	Date	Event
208		Roman invasion of Caledonia 208–210: Septimius Severus invaded modern Scotland.
209		Septimius Severus named his youngest natural son Publius Septimius Geta co-ruler with himself and Caracalla.
211	4 February	Septimius Severus died.
211		Roman invasion of Caledonia 208–210: Caracalla ended the campaign.
211	26 December	Geta was murdered in his mother's arms by members of the Praetorian Guard loyal to Caracalla.
217	8 April	Caracalla was assassinated by a member of his bodyguard.
217	8 April	The Praetorian Guard acclaimed their prefect Macrinus ruler of Rome.
218	8 June	Macrinus was captured and executed by an army loyal to Elagabalus, supposedly the illegitimate son of Caracalla.
222	11 March	Elagabalus was assassinated by the Praetorian Guard, which installed his young cousin Severus Alexander as ruler of Rome.
230		Roman–Persian Wars: The Sasanian shah Ardashir I invaded Mesopotamia and Syria.
232		Roman–Persian Wars: Alexander repelled the Sasanian invasion.
235	19 March	Alexander was killed in a mutiny of the Legio XXII Primigenia at Mainz.
235	20 March	The army elected Maximinus Thrax, commander of the Legio IV Italica, ruler of Rome.
235		In 235 AD, Maximinus Thrax leads a rebellion against 26-year-old Emperor Alexander Severus. Thrax's men approached Alexander who pleads with his soldiers to take up arms, but instead abandon a weeping Severus to the Imperial tent and his mother's arms there to await capture and execution. Civil wars would follow with the first breaking out in 238, another in 249 followed by a third in 253. From 235 through 284 the average reign of a Roman Emperor was just 18 months, down from average just over 9 years during the first centuries of the Empire.
238	22 March	Gordian I, governor of Africa, accepted the rule of Rome at the urging of rebels in his province. He appointed his son Gordian II to rule jointly with him.
238	2 April	The Senate accepted Gordian I and Gordian II as rulers of Rome.
238		Battle of Carthage (238): Forces loyal to Gordian I and Gordian II were defeated by the army of Capelianus, the governor of Numidia, who claimed fealty to Maximinus. Gordian II was killed. Gordian I committed suicide.
238	22 April	The Senate elected two senators, Pupienus and Balbinus, as joint rulers of the Empire.
238	22 April	Facing popular opposition to Pupienus and Balbinus, the Senate gave Gordian I's young grandson Gordian III the title Caesar.
238	May	Maximinus was murdered with his son during a mutiny of the Legio II Parthica at Aquileia.
238	29 July	Pupienus and Balbinus were tortured and murdered by the Praetorian Guard in their barracks.
243		Battle of Resaena: Roman forces defeated the Sasanian Empire at Resaena.
244		Battle of Misiche: The Sasanian Empire decisively defeated a Roman force at Misiche, near modern Fallujah. Gordian III was killed, probably by a fellow Roman. He was succeeded by Philip the Arab, the prefect of the Praetorian Guard, who was forced to cede Mesopotamia and Armenia to the Sasanian Empire.
249		Philip was killed at Verona in battle with Decius, commander of Roman forces in Pannonia and Moesia.
251		Decius appointed his natural son Herennius Etruscus co-ruler of Rome jointly with himself.
251		Battle of Abritus: Roman forces were dealt a bloody defeat by the Goths near modern Razgrad. Decius and Herennius were killed.
251		The armies of the Danube region acclaimed their commander Trebonianus Gallus ruler of Rome.
251		The Senate recognized Decius's son Hostilian as ruler of Rome. Gallus adopted Hostilian as his son.
251		Plague of Cyprian: Hostilian died, probably of plague.
251		Gallus appointed his natural son Volusianus co-ruler jointly with himself.
253		Battle of Barbalissos: A Sasanian force destroyed a Roman army at Barbalissos.
253	August	Gallus and Volusianus were killed in a mutiny at Terni. The army acclaimed Aemilianus, governor of Pannonia and Moesia, ruler of Rome.
253		Aemilianus was killed by his own soldiers in the face of the army of the general Valerian (emperor).
253	22 October	Valerian gave his son Gallienus the title Caesar.
256		The Sasanian Empire conquered and sacked Antioch.
257		Valerian reconquered Antioch.
258		The Goths invaded Asia Minor.
260		Death of Dacian king Regalianus that became Roman emperor for a brief period.
260		Valerian was taken prisoner by the Sasanian Empire during truce negotiations.
260	September	The general Postumus was declared ruler of Rome in the Gallic Empire.
264		Valerian died in captivity.
267		Odaenathus, the king of Palmyra and a Roman client, was assassinated. His widow Zenobia took power as regent for their son Vaballathus.
268		Gallienus was murdered by his soldiers during a siege of Pontirolo Nuovo.
268	September	The general Claudius Gothicus was declared ruler of Rome by his soldiers.
269		Postumus was killed by his soldiers, who in turn acclaimed one of their own, Marcus Aurelius Marius, emperor of the Gallic Empire.
269		Marius was murdered by Victorinus, formerly prefect of Postumus's Praetorian Guard, who replaced him as emperor of the Gallic Empire.
269		Zenobia conquered Egypt.
269		Battle of Naissus: Roman forces decisively defeated the Goths at modern Niš, stalling an invasion of the Balkans.
270	January	Claudius Gothicus died. He was succeeded by his brother Quintillus.
270	April	Quintillus died at Aquileia.
270	September	Aurelian became ruler of Rome.
271		Battle of Fano: A Roman force defeated the Juthungi on the Metauro.
271		Victorinus was murdered by an officer he had cuckolded.
271		Tetricus I, praeses of Gallia Aquitania was acclaimed emperor of the Gallic Empire. He appointed his natural son Tetricus II to rule jointly with him.
272		Zenobia was arrested en route to refuge in the Sasanian Empire.
273		Palmyra rebelled against Roman authority and was destroyed.
274		Battle of Châlons (274): Aurelian defeated the forces of Tetricus I and Tetricus II at modern Châlons-en-Champagne.
275	September	Aurelian was murdered by the Praetorian Guard.
275	25 September	The Senate elected Tacitus (emperor) ruler of Rome.
276	June	Tacitus died.
276		Marcus Aurelius Probus, commander of Roman forces in the east and Tacitus's half-brother, was acclaimed ruler of Rome by his troops.
276		Florianus, prefect of the Praetorian Guard and commander of Roman forces in the west, was acclaimed ruler of Rome by his troops.
276	September	Florianus was assassinated near Tarsus by his troops following a defeat at the hands of Probus.
279		Probus launched a campaign against the Vandals in Illyricum.
282		The Praetorian Guard elected their prefect Carus ruler of Rome.
282		Probus was assassinated.
282		Carus gave his sons Carinus and Numerian the title Caesar.
283		Carus died.
284		Numerian died.
284	20 November	Roman forces in the east elected the consul Diocletian their ruler and proclaimed him augustus.
285	July	Battle of the Margus: Forces loyal to Diocletian defeated Carinus in battle on the Morava. Carinus was killed.
285	July	Diocletian gave Maximian the title Caesar.
286		Carausian Revolt: The naval commander Carausius declared himself emperor in Britain and northern Gaul.
286	2 April	Diocletian proclaimed Maximian augustus of the west, ruling himself as augustus of the east.
293		Diocletian established the Tetrarchy, appointing Constantius Chlorus to hold the office of Caesar under Maximian in the west and Galerius to hold the title under himself in the east.
293		Carausian Revolt: Constantius Chlorus conquered Carausius's Gallic territories.
293		Carausius was murdered by his finance minister Allectus, who replaced him as emperor in Britain.
296		Carausian Revolt: Allectus was defeated in battle and killed at Calleva Atrebatum.

== 4th century ==
Year	Date	Event
301		Diocletian issued the Edict on Maximum Prices, reforming the currency and setting price ceilings on a number of goods.
303	24 February	Diocletianic Persecution: Diocletian issued his first edict against Christians, calling for the destruction of Christian holy books and places of worship and stripping Christians of their government positions and political rights.
305	1 May	Diocletian and Maximian abdicated. Constantius and Galerius were elevated to augusti in the west and east. Galerius appointed Flavius Valerius Severus Caesar in the west and Maximinus II Caesar in the east.
306	25 July	Constantius died at Eboracum. By his dying wish, his troops acclaimed his son Constantine the Great augustus.
306		Galerius recognized Flavius Valerius Severus as augustus in the west and granted Constantine the Great the lesser title of Caesar, which he accepted.
306		Civil wars of the Tetrarchy: Rioters in Rome acclaimed Maximian's son Maxentius ruler of Rome. He took the title princeps invictus, undefeated prince.
306		Maxentius invited Maximian to reclaim the title augustus.
307		Civil wars of the Tetrarchy: Flavius Valerius Severus surrendered to Maximian at Ravenna.
307		Civil wars of the Tetrarchy: Galerius laid siege to Rome. Many of his soldiers defected to Maxentius and he was forced to flee.
308		Civil wars of the Tetrarchy: After a failed coup against his son Maxentius, Maximian was forced to flee to Constantine's court.
308	11 November	Maximian resigned as augustus. Galerius appointed Licinius augustus of the west and confirmed his recognition of Constantine the Great as Caesar of the west.
310	July	Civil wars of the Tetrarchy: Maximian was forced to commit suicide following a failed coup against Constantine the Great.
311	May	Galerius died. Licinius and Maximinus agreed to divide the eastern Empire between themselves.
311		Civil wars of the Tetrarchy: Constantine the Great concluded an alliance with Licinius, offering his half-sister Flavia Julia Constantia to him in marriage.
311		Civil wars of the Tetrarchy: Maximinus entered a secret alliance with Maxentius.
311	3 December	Diocletian died, possibly from suicide.
312	28 October	Battle of the Milvian Bridge: Constantine the Great had a vision of the cross appearing over the sun at the Ponte Milvio with the words "in this sign, conquer." His forces defeated and killed Maxentius.
313	February	Constantine the Great and Licinius issued the Edict of Milan, providing for restitution to Christians injured during the persecutions.
313	March	Licinius married Constantia.
313	30 April	Battle of Tzirallum: Licinius defeated a vastly numerically superior force loyal to Maximinus at modern Çorlu. Maximinus fled to Nicomedia.
313	August	Maximinus died at Tarsus.
314	8 October	Battle of Cibalae: Constantine the Great dealt a bloody defeat to Licinius's forces at modern Vinkovci.
317		Battle of Mardia: After a bloody battle, probably at modern Harmanli, Licinius retreated from contact with Constantine the Great.
317	1 March	Licinius recognized Constantine the Great as his superior, ceded all his territories outside of Thrace, and agreed to depose and execute Valerius Valens, whom he had raised to augustus.
324	3 July	Battle of Adrianople (324): Licinius suffered a bloody defeat at the hands of Constantine the Great on the Maritsa.
324	18 September	Battle of Chrysopolis: Constantine the Great dealt a decisive defeat to the remnants of Licinius's army. Licinius surrendered.
325	20 May	First Council of Nicaea: An ecumenical council called by Constantine the Great at Nicaea opened which would establish the Nicene Creed, asserting Jesus to be equal to and of the same substance as God the Father.
325		Licinius was executed.
326		Constantine the Great ordered the death of his oldest son Crispus.
330	11 May	Constantine the Great moved his capital to Byzantium and renamed the city Constantinople, city of Constantine.
332		Constantine the Great campaigned against the Goths.
334		Constantine the Great campaigned against the Sarmatians.
337		Roman–Persian Wars: The Sasanian shah Shapur II invaded Armenia and Mesopotamia.
337	22 May	Constantine the Great died.
337	9 September	Constantine the Great's three sons declared themselves augusti and divided their father's empire into three parts, with Constantine II (emperor) receiving Britain, Iberia, Gaul and Illyria, Constantius II Asia, Syria Palaestina and Egypt, and Constans Italy and Africa. The young Constans was placed under Constantine II's guardianship.
338		Constantine II campaigned against the Alemanni.
338		Constantine II granted Illyria to his brother Constans.
340		Constantine II invaded Italy. He was ambushed and slain at Aquileia by Constans, who inherited his territory.
341		Constans and Constantius II issued a ban against pagan sacrifice.
344		Siege of Singara: Sasanian forces failed to capture the Roman fortress of Singara.
350	18 January	Magnentius, commander of the Jovians and Herculians, was acclaimed ruler of Rome by his legions.
350		Constans was killed in Elne by followers of Magnentius.
350	3 June	Constantius Chlorus's grandson Nepotianus entered Rome with a band of gladiators and there declared himself imperator.
350	30 June	Marcellinus (magister officiorum), one of Magnentius's generals, entered Rome and executed Nepotianus.
351	15 March	Constantius II granted his cousin Constantius Gallus the title Caesar.
351	28 September	Battle of Mursa Major: Constantius II defeated Magnentius in a bloody battle in the valley of the Drava.
353		Battle of Mons Seleucus: Constantius II dealt Magnentius a decisive defeat at modern La Bâtie-Montsaléon. Magnentius committed suicide.
354		Gallus was put to death.
355	6 November	Constantius II declared Julian (emperor) Caesar and granted him command in Gaul.
357		Battle of Strasbourg: Julian defeated a vastly superior Alemanni force near Argentoratum, solidifying Roman control west of the Rhine.
360	February	The Petulantes, ordered east from Paris in preparation for a war with the Sasanian Empire, instead mutinied and proclaimed Julian augustus.
361	3 November	Constantius II named Julian as his successor before dying of fever.
363	5 March	Julian's Persian War: Roman forces embarked from Antioch on a punitive expedition against the Sasanian Empire.
363	26 June	Battle of Samarra: Sasanian forces harassed a Roman army in retreat at Samarra from a failed siege of their capital Ctesiphon. Julian was killed.
363	27 June	Julian's army declared one of their generals, Jovian (emperor), augustus.
363	July	Julian's Persian War: Jovian agreed to cede the five provinces east of the Tigris to the Sasanian Empire, ending the war.
364	17 February	Jovian died.
364	26 February	The army acclaimed the general Valentinian I the Great augustus.
364	28 March	Valentinian the Great appointed his younger brother Valens augustus with rule over the eastern Empire, and continued as augustus in the west.
365	21 July	An earthquake near Crete with a magnitude of at least eight affects the Eastern Mediterranean. Combined with a subsequent tsunami, residents of Sicily are among the casualties.
375	17 November	Valentinian the Great died of a stroke. His son Gratian, then junior augustus in the west, succeeded him as senior augustus.
375	22 November	The army acclaimed Valentinian the Great's young son Valentinian II augustus of the west.
376		Fleeing Hunnic aggression, the Goths, under the leadership of the Thervingi chieftain Fritigern, crossed the Danube and entered the eastern Empire as political refugees.
376		Gothic War (376–382): Following the deaths of several Roman soldiers during civil unrest in Thrace, the officer Lupicinus arrested Fritigern and the Greuthungi chieftain Alatheus.
378	9 August	Battle of Adrianople: A combined Gothic-Alanic force decisively defeated the Roman army near Edirne. Valens was killed.
379	19 January	Gratian named the general Theodosius I the Great augustus in the east.
380	27 February	Theodosius the Great issued the Edict of Thessalonica, making Christianity the state church of the Roman Empire.
382	3 October	Gothic War (376–382): The Goths were made foederati of Rome and granted land and autonomy in Thrace, ending the war.
383	25 August	Gratian was delivered by mutineers to the Magister equitum Andragathius and executed.
392	15 May	Valentinian II was found hanged in his residence. He may have been murdered by his guardian, the Frankish general Arbogast (magister militum).
392	22 August	Arbogast declared Eugenius augustus and ruler in the west.
393	23 January	Theodosius the Great appointed his younger son Honorius (emperor) augustus in the west.
394	6 September	Battle of the Frigidus: Forces loyal to Theodosius the Great defeated and killed Arbogast and Eugenius, probably near the Vipava.
395	17 January	Theodosius the Great died. His elder son Arcadius succeeded him as augustus in the eastern Byzantine Empire. The young Honorius became sole augustus in the Western Roman Empire under the regency of Magister militum Stilicho.
398		Gildonic War: Gildo, comes of Africa, was killed following a failed rebellion against the Western Roman Empire.

== 5th century ==
Year	Date	Event
402		The capital of the Western Roman Empire was moved to Ravenna.
405		War of Radagaisus: Invasion of Radagaisus in the Northern part of Italy.
406	31 December	Crossing of the Rhine: A coalition of foreign tribes including the Germanic Vandals, Suebi and Iranian Alans invaded the Western Roman Empire across the Rhine.
408	1 May	Arcadius died.
410	24 August	Sack of Rome (410): Rome was sacked by the Visigoths under their king Alaric I.
421	8 February	Honorius appointed his brother-in-law and Magister militum Constantius III co-ruler of the Western Roman Empire with himself.
421	2 September	Constantius III died.
423	15 August	Honorius died.
423		The Western Roman patrician Castinus declared the primicerius Joannes augustus.
424	23 October	The Byzantine augustus Theodosius II the Younger, the Calligrapher named the young Valentinian III, his cousin and Constantius III's son, Caesar with rule over the west. His mother Galla Placidia was appointed regent.
425		Joannes was executed in Aquileia.
427		Roman civil war of 427–429
432		Roman civil war of 432
447		Battle of the Utus: The Huns under Attila defeated a Byzantine army in a bloody battle near the river Utus.
450	28 July	Theodosius the Younger died in a riding accident.
452		Attila abandoned his invasion of Italy following a meeting at the Mincio with the pope Pope Leo I.
455	16 March	Valentinian III was assassinated on orders of the senator Petronius Maximus.
455	17 March	The Senate acclaimed Maximus augustus of the Western Roman Empire.
455	31 May	Maximus was killed by a mob as he attempted to flee Rome in the face of a Vandal advance.
455	2 June	Sack of Rome (455): The Vandals entered and began to sack Rome.
455	9 July	The Magister militum Avitus was pronounced augustus of the Western Roman Empire at Toulouse by the Visigothic king Theodoric II.
456	17 October	Avitus was forced to flee Rome following a military coup by the general Ricimer and the domesticus Majorian.
457		Avitus died.
457	27 January	The Byzantine augustus Marcian died.
457	28 February	The Byzantine augustus Leo I the Thracian appointed Majorian Magister militum in the west.
457	1 April	The army acclaimed Majorian augustus of the Western Roman Empire.
461	7 August	Majorian was killed after torture near the Staffora on Ricimer's orders, followed by a civil war.
461	19 November	The Senate elected Libius Severus from among their number as augustus of the Western Roman Empire.
465	15 August	Severus died.
467	12 April	Leo the Thracian elevated the comes Anthemius to Caesar with rule over the Western Roman Empire.
468		Battle of Cap Bon (468): The Vandal Kingdom destroyed a combined Western Roman and Byzantine invasion fleet at Cap Bon.
472	11 July	Anthemius was killed in flight following Ricimer's conquest of Rome. Maximus's son Olybrius was acclaimed augustus of the Western Roman Empire.
472	18 August	Ricimer died.
472		Ricimer's nephew Gundobad succeeded him as Magister militum and took the title Patrician.
472		Olybrius died.
473	3 March	The Germanic elements of the army elected the domesticus Glycerius augustus of the Western Roman Empire.
473		Gundobad relinquished his Western Roman titles to succeed his father as king of Burgundy.
474		Leo the Thracian appointed Julius Nepos, his nephew and governor of Dalmatia, ruler of the Western Roman Empire in opposition to Glycerius.
474	18 January	Leo the Thracian died. He was succeeded by his grandson Leo II (emperor).
474	9 February	Zeno (emperor) became co-augustus of the Byzantine Empire with his young son Leo II.
474	July	Nepos deposed Glycerius.
474	17 November	Leo II died, possibly after being poisoned by his mother Ariadne (empress).
475	January	Zeno was forced to flee Constantinople for his homeland Isauria in the face of a popular revolt.
475	9 January	Basiliscus, brother of Leo the Thracian's widow Verina, was acclaimed augustus of the Byzantine Empire by the Byzantine Senate.
475		Nepos appointed Orestes (father of Romulus Augustulus) Magister militum and commander-in-chief of the Western Roman military.
475	28 August	Orestes took control of the Western Roman capital Ravenna, forcing Nepos to flee to Dalmatia.
475	31 October	Orestes declared his young son Romulus Augustulus augustus of the Western Roman Empire.
476	August	Zeno recaptured Constantinople and accepted Basiliscus's surrender.
476	23 August	Germanic foederati under the command of the general Odoacer renounced Western Roman authority and declared Odoacer their king.
476	28 August	Odoacer captured and executed Orestes at Piacenza.
476	4 September	Odoacer conquered the Western Roman capital Ravenna, forced Romulus to abdicate and declared himself king of Italy, the first King of Italy
476		The Senate sent Zeno the imperial regalia of the Western Roman Empire.
480	25 April	Nepos was murdered in his residence in Split.
491	9 April	Zeno died.
493		An Ostrogoth known as Theoderic the Great succeeds Odoacer as King of Italy.

== 6th century ==
Year	Date	Event
508		The East-Roman Emperor Anastasius I sends a fleet of 100 warships to raid the coasts of Italy.
518	9 July	Augustus Anastasius I Dicorus died.
527	1 April	Augustus Justin I appointed his older son Justinian I the Great co-augustus with himself.
527	1 August	Justin I died.
529	7 April	The Codex Justinianus, which attempted to consolidate and reconcile contradictions in Roman law, was promulgated.
529		St. Benedict of Nursia establishes his first monastery at the hill of Monte Cassino.
532		Justinian the Great ordered the construction of the Hagia Sophia in Constantinople.
533	21 June	Vandalic War: A Byzantine force under the general Belisarius departed for the Vandal Kingdom.
533	13 Sept	Battle of Ad Decimum: A Byzantine army defeated a Vandal force near Carthage.
533	15 Dec	Battle of Tricamarum: The Byzantines defeated a Vandal army and forced their king Gelimer into flight.
534	March	Vandalic War: Gelimer surrendered to Belisarius and accepted his offer of a peaceful retirement in Galatia, ending the war. The territory of the Vandal Kingdom was reorganized as the praetorian prefecture of Africa.
535		Gothic War (535–554): Byzantine forces crossing from Africa invaded Sicily, then an Ostrogothic possession.
536	December	Gothic War (535–554): Byzantium took Rome with little Ostrogothic resistance.
537	27 Dec	The Hagia Sophia was completed.
552	July	Battle of Taginae: A Byzantine army dealt a decisive defeat to the Ostrogoths at Gualdo Tadino. The Ostrogoth king Totila was killed.
553		Battle of Mons Lactarius: An Ostrogothic force was ambushed and destroyed at Monti Lattari on its way to relieve a Byzantine siege of Cumae. The Ostrogoth king Teia was killed.
565	March	Belisarius died.
565	14 Nov	Justinian the Great died.
568		The Lombards invade the Italian Peninsula and establish the Kingdom of the Lombards.
573		The general Narses died.
574		Augustus Justin II began to suffer from fits of insanity.
577		The Duchy of Benevento is established.
578	5 October	Justin II died.
582	14 August	Augustus Tiberius II Constantine died.

== 7th century ==
Year	Date	Event
602		Byzantine–Sasanian War of 602–628: The Sasanian Empire declared war on Byzantium.
607	1 August	Augustus Phocas dedicated the Column of Phocas in the Roman Forum.
626	June	Siege of Constantinople (626): Sasanian and Avar forces laid siege to Constantinople.
634	April	Muslim conquest of the Levant: A Rashidun army departed Medina for the Levant.
640	January	Muslim conquest of Egypt: A Rashidun force laid siege to Pelusium.
640		The legions of the East Roman army were reorganized into themes.
641	8 Nov	Siege of Alexandria (641): Byzantine authorities in the Egyptian capital Alexandria surrendered to the besieging Rashidun army.
661		Brothers Perctarit and Godepert share the ruling power of King of the Lombards.
661		The Duchy of Naples is established as a Byzantine province in the coastal territory that the Lombards had not conquered during their invasion in the sixth century.
662		Grimoald, King of the Lombards.
663		Basileus Constans II visited Rome.
698		Battle of Carthage (698): An Umayyad siege and blockade of Carthage forced the retreat of Byzantine forces. The city was conquered and destroyed.

== 8th century ==
Year	Date	Event
730		Basileus Leo III the Isaurian promulgated an edict forbidding the veneration of religious images, beginning the first Byzantine Iconoclasm.
774	10 July	Charlemagne is crowned in Pavia and becomes King of the Lombards.
787	23 October	Second Council of Nicaea: An ecumenical council in Nicaea ended which endorsed the veneration of images, ending the first Byzantine Iconoclasm.

== 9th century ==
Year	Date	Event
813		Charlemagne crowns his son Louis the Pious of Aquitaine as co-emperor.
814	28 January	Charlemagne dies in Aachen of pleurisy.
851		The Principality of Salerno is established.
861		The Principality of Capua is established.

== 10th century ==
Year	Date	Event
961	25 Dec	Otto I becomes King of Italy.
965		The Byzantine Empire establishes the Catepanate of Italy.
973	7 May	Otto I succumbs to a fever and dies.
980	25 Dec	Otto II becomes the King of Italy.
983	7 Dec	Otto II dies due to an outbreak of malaria.
996	12 April	Otto III becomes King of Italy.
999		The Normans begin migrating to Italy where they primarily work as mercenaries serving the Byzantines and Lombard nobles.

== 11th century ==
Year	Date	Event
1002	23 Jan	Otto III dies of a sudden fever in a castle near Civita Castellana.
1030		Aversa is established, marking the start of permanent Norman settlements in Italy.
1043		William of Hauteville and the Normans found the County of Apulia and Calabria composed of the territories of Gargano, Capitanata, Apulia, Vulture, and most of Campania.
1046		Italian feudal ruler and militant noblewoman Matilda of Tuscany is born.
1053	18 June	The Normans, led by the Count of Apulia, Humphrey of Hauteville defeat a Swabian-Italian-Lombard army organized by Pope Leo IX and led on the battlefield by Gerard, Duke of Lorraine and Rudolf, Prince of Benevento at the Battle of Civitate. The Norman victory marked the climax of the conflict between the Normans who began to migrate to southern Italy at the end of the tenth century and the local Lombard princes.
1053		The Duchy of Benevento ends.
1059	23 Aug	The Treaty of Melfi is signed between Pope Nicholas II and the Norman princes Robert Guiscard and Richard I of Capua. Per the accord, Pope Nicholas recognizes the Norman conquest of Southern Italy and Robert Guiscard as the Duke of Apulia and Calabria, and the Count of Sicily.
1061		Robert Guiscard and the Normans first invade Sicily.
1063	June	Roger I of Sicily and the Normans defeat a Muslim alliance of Sicilian and Zirid troops at the Battle of Cerami, the most significant battle of the Norman conquest of Sicily.
1071		The Byzantine Catepanate of Italy ends.
1077		The Principality of Salerno ends.
1087		In the Mahdia campaign of 1087, seafaring vessels from the Italian maritime republics of Genoa and Pisa attack the North African town of Mahdia, burning Mahdia's Muslim fleet in the harbour.
1091	Feb	The Norman conquest of Sicily is complete.

== 12th century ==
Year	Date	Event
1115	24 July	Matilda of Tuscany dies of gout.
1130	25 Dec	Roger II of Sicily, the Norman, founds the Kingdom of Sicily which includes the island of Sicily, the southern portion of the Italian Peninsula, and for a time, territory in Northern Africa.
1137		The Duchy of Naples ends when Duke Sergius VII is forced to surrender to Roger II of Sicily and the Normans.
1139		The Principality of Capua ends.
1170		Leonardo of Pisa, an Italian mathematician more famously known as Fibonacci, is born.
1176	29 May	Battle of Legnano: the troops of the Lombard League defeated forces of the Holy Roman Empire. The battle is alluded to in the Canto degli Italiani by Goffredo Mameli and Michele Novaro, which reads: «From the Alps to Sicily, Legnano is everywhere» in memory of the victory of Italian populations over foreign ones. Thanks to this battle, Legnano is the only city, besides Rome, to be mentioned in the Italian national anthem.
1194		Henry VI, Holy Roman Emperor conquers the Kingdom of Sicily.

== 13th century ==
Year	Date	Event
1202		Fibonacci's Liber Abaci, a book on arithmetic, helps to popularise the Hindu–Arabic numeral system and brings the idea of the integer sequence known as the Fibonacci number to locations outside India.
1254		Marco Polo is born in the Republic of Venice.
1265		Dante Alighieri is born. He is considered the father of the Italian language for writing works in his dialect, which would become standardized into Modern Italian.
1282	30 March	The War of the Sicilian Vespers begins.

== 14th century ==
Year	Date	Event
1302	31 August	The War of the Sicilian Vespers ends.
1302		Sicily is given to Frederick III of the House of Barcelona.
1308		Dante Alighieri begins writing the Divine Comedy.
1320		Dante Alighieri finished writing his Divine Comedy.
1323		Alfonso IV of Aragon begins the conquest of Sardinia.
1377		Filippo Brunelleschi, a famous Italian architect, is born in Florence, Italy.

== 15th century ==
Year	Date	Event
1451	October	Christopher Columbus is born.
1452	15 April	Leonardo da Vinci is born
1475	6 March	Michelangelo is born
1494		The Italian War of 1494–1498, or First Italian War, begins, marking the first major battle in the Italian Wars.
1498		The First Italian War ends in a victory for the League of Venice.
1499		The Italian War of 1499-1504, or Second Italian War, begins.

== 16th century ==
Year	Date	Event
1501-1504		Michelangelo creates the David
1503-1513		Reign of pope Julius II
1525	6 May	The Sack of Rome (1527) by mutinous troops of Charles V, Holy Roman Emperor during the War of the League of Cognac. It's considered one of the causes of the decline of the High Renaissance.
1551		The Italian War of 1551-1559, or Last Italian War begins.
1545-1563		Council of Trent
1559	3 April	The Last Italian War ends with a peace treaty signed between Henry II of France, Elizabeth I of England, Ferdinand I, Holy Roman Emperor, and Philip II of Spain at Le Cateau-Cambrésis.
1564	15 February	Galileo is born in Pisa.

== 17th century ==
Year	Date	Event
1633		The Palio di Siena is held for the first time.
1678	4 March	Antonio Vivaldi, a famous Italian Baroque composer, is born in Venice.

== 18th century ==
Year	Date	Event
1725		Antonio Vivaldi publishes a now-famous set of concertos entitled The Four Seasons as part of a set of twelve concerti called Il cimento dell'armonia e dell'inventione.
1741	28 July	Without a sustainable source of income or royal protection, the impoverished Antonio Vivaldi dies of infection during the night.
1768		Corsica passes from the Republic of Genoa to France after the Treaty of Versailles.
1789	21 August	The national colours of Italy first appear on a tricolour cockade.
1796		Napoleon Bonaparte and his French Army of Italy invade Italy.
1796	17 November	Napoleon defeats József Alvinczi at the Battle of Arcole.
1797	7 January	The Italian tricolour is adopted for the first time as official flag, by the government of the Cispadane Republic.
1797	12 May	Fall of the Republic of Venice.

== 19th century ==
Year	Date	Event
1809		Napoleon Bonaparte occupies Rome, exiles Pope Pius VII to Savona and then to France, and takes the Papal States' art collections to the Louvre.
1813	10 October	Giuseppe Verdi is born
1821		A revolt in Piedmont, led by Annibale Santorre di Rossi de Pomarolo, takes place in an attempt to remove the Austrians from Italy and unify the Italian territories under the House of Savoy.
1830		A series of uprisings along the Italian Peninsula occur, calling out for the merging of the different territories in the peninsula into one unified nation.
1831	Spring	Austrian troops gradually crush political resistance along the Italian peninsula.
1831	July	The political movement Young Italy is formed by activist Giuseppe Mazzini, promoting insurrection in Italian states and Austrian lands to help unify Italy.
1834	28 May	Mazzini is arrested in Solothurn and exiled from Switzerland.
1846		Pope Pius IX is elected, and his support of the unification of Italy helps to further popularise the movement.
1847	29 November	Charles Albert of Sardinia implements the Perfect Fusion of the Savoyard state extending the reforms carried out on the mainland to the island of Sardinia
1847	10 December	Il Canto degli Italiani, the Italian national anthem since 1946, makes its public debut.
1848		Fuelled by the revolutionary republican ideology of Mazzini, uprisings lead to revolutionary governments being briefly installed in Rome, Milan (see Cinque giornate di Milano), and Venice, and the establishment of constitutions in the Kingdom of the Two Sicilies, the Papal States, and Tuscany. Takeover by reactionary forces and the defeat of Piedmont-Sardinia by Austria lead to a failure in the First Italian War of Independence.
1849	9 February	A Roman Republic is declared following an election.
1849	March	Mazzini arrives in Rome and is appointed Chief Minister of the Roman Republic.
1856		The Congress of Paris, a peace conference held between Austria, France, Prussia, the Kingdom of Great Britain, the Ottoman Empire, the Russian Empire, and the Kingdom of Sardinia, is held to make peace after the Crimean War.
1856		Italian statesman Camillo Benso of Cavour disparages Austria's intrusive presence in the Italian Peninsula.
1858		Napoleon III and Cavour meet secretly in France, in Plombières-les-Bains, where they make the Plombières Agreement. They decide that Cavour will provoke rebellion in Austrian territories in Northern Italy so as to tempt Austria into making a military decision.
1859		After having allied with France, under the lead of Cavour, the Kingdom of Piedmont-Sardinia provokes Austria to war and secure the takeover of Milan and Lombardy (Second Italian War of Independence). Plebiscites subsequently guarantee the annexation of Tuscany, Emilian dukedoms, and Papal-controlled central Italy. Savoy and Nice are ceded to France in exchange for recognition. (to 1860) The annexation of Nice to France caused the Niçard exodus, or the emigration of a quarter of the Niçard Italians to Italy, and the Niçard Vespers.
1860		The Expedition of the Thousand takes place, in which volunteers led by Giuseppe Garibaldi set out to conquer the Kingdom of the Two Sicilies, which collapses. The Papal States are reduced to Latium.
1861	17 March	Most of the states of the Italian Peninsula are united under King Victor Emmanuel II of the Savoy dynasty, proclamated King of Italy.
1865		The capital of Italy is moved from Turin to Florence, in order to approach it to Rome, considered the natural capital, but still under Papal rule and French protection.
1866	20 June – 12 August	The Third Italian War of Independence, between the Kingdom of Italy and Austrian Empire, occurs, resulting in no true victory by either side.
1866	3 October	After some heavy losses, like Custoza and Lissa, and few wins (most of them by Giuseppe Garibaldi), thanks to Prussian victories the Kingdom of Italy gains Veneto and western Friuli by the Treaty of Vienna. Trento and Trieste remains "irredeemed".
1870	20 September	Following the defeat of Napoleon III in the French-Prussian War, Italian forces occupy Rome. The Italian Army breaks into the walls of Rome by the breach of Porta Pia.
1870	2 October	Rome replaces Florence as the capital city of Italy.
1870	2 October	Italian Prime Minister Lanza holds a plebiscite in Rome and the citizens overwhelming vote in favor of union with Italy.
1870	9 October	A royal decree confirms the incorporation of Rome and surrounding Lazio into the Kingdom of Italy.
1878	3 January	King Victor Emmanuel II of Italy dies.
1878	9 January	Victor Emmanuel II's son, Umberto I, takes the throne.
1882	5 July	The bay of Assab (Eritrea) becomes the first official Italian colonial possession in Africa.
1889		Somalia is established as the second Italian colony in Africa.
1895		21-year-old Guglielmo Marconi invents the radio telegraph.
1896		The French Lumière brothers publicly screen some of the earliest films in the history of cinema in various locations in Italy. The first Italian director is considered to be Vittorio Calcina, a collaborator of the Lumière Brothers, who filmed Pope Leo XIII in 1896, giving birth to the cinema of Italy.
1900		the population is about 32.4 million
1900	29 July	King Umberto I is assassinated. Umberto I's son, Victor Emmanuel III, takes the throne

== 20th century ==
Year	Date	Event
1906		The poet Giosuè Carducci is the first Italian to win the Nobel Prize in Literature.
1907		Maria Montessori establishes her first Casa dei Bambini in Rome.
1907		Ernestina Prola becomes the first Italian woman to get a driving licence.
1908	28 Dec	The 7.1 M_{w} Messina earthquake shakes Southern Italy with a maximum Mercalli intensity of XI (Extreme), killing between 75,000 and 200,000.
1911		Italy defeats the Ottoman Empire and gains control over Libya and the Rhodes archipelago.
1911		The Anniversary of the Unification of Italy is established.
1911	4 June	The Altare della Patria is solemnly inaugurated.
1915	23 May	Although initially aligned with Germany and Austria-Hungary, Italy enters World War I on the side of the Anglo-French Allies after the Treaty of London.
1918	4 November	Armistice of Villa Giusti, with which Austria-Hungary surrenders to Italy, ending the war. After World War I, Italy expands its borders well beyond Trento and Trieste, including Bolzano/Bozen, Pola/Pula, Fiume/Rijeka and Zara/Zadar.
1919		Benito Mussolini and his supporters found the Fasci Italiani di Combattimento, the predecessor of the National Fascist Party.
1919		Enzo Ferrari, having no other job perspective, eventually settles for a job at a small car company called CMN (Costruzioni Meccaniche Nazionali) redesigning used truck bodies into small passenger cars.
1919		The National Unity and Armed Forces Day is established.
1921	4 November	The body of the Italian Unknown Soldier is solemnly buried at the Altare della Patria.
1922		After the lack of a compromise between socialists and Christian-democrats, and the March on Rome of the fascist militias, Benito Mussolini is named by the King as prime minister of Italy.
1926		Mussolini assumes dictatorial powers.
1926		The novelist Grazia Deledda is the first Italian woman who is awarded the Nobel Prize for Literature.
1929	3 January	Italian film director Sergio Leone is born.
1934		The Italy national football team wins its first FIFA World Cup.
1936		Following the invasion of Ethiopia, Italy is expelled from the League of Nations. Mussolini and Hitler signed the Rome-Berlin Axis.
1938		The Italy national football team wins its second FIFA World Cup.
1938		Enrico Fermi is awarded the Nobel Prize in Physics for his work on induced radioactivity.
1940		Italy enters World War II by invading Greece from Albania, which had been occupied in 1939.
1941		While they are confined on the island of Ventotene by the Fascist regime, Altiero Spinelli and Ernesto Rossi compile the Ventotene Manifesto, entitled "Towards a Free and United Europe". With his Manifesto, Spinelli gives the major contribution to the formulation of the Federalist thinking and is later one of the main figures of the European Parliament.
1943		Nazi troops occupy Northern Italy, release Mussolini from prison and have him leading the puppet Italian Social Republic. Allied troops fight in the following two years to free the whole peninsula. The Italian Resistance plays a growing role in harassing German occupation forces.
1943	25 July	After the Allied occupy Sicily, the government of Mussolini is overthrown by the same Grand Council of Fascism.
1943	8 September	General Badoglio signs the Armistice of Cassibile.
1945	25 April	Milan is finally liberated on 25 April 1945. Resistance fighters catch Benito Mussolini as he flees north in the hope of reaching Switzerland. They shoot him along with his lover, Clara Petacci. The corpses are brought back to Milan and hang in a gas station in Piazzale Loreto.
1945	2 May	Surrender of Caserta, whereby the German forces in Italy surrender, ending the Italian Campaign of World War II and the Italian Civil War.
1945	10 December	Alcide De Gasperi becomes prime minister, holding the office until 1953. He is one of the Founding Fathers of the European Union and the first republican prime minister of Italy.
1946	22 April	The Liberation Day is established.
1946	2 June	Italians vote to abolish the monarchy and establish a new republic; King Umberto II, who succeeded his father Victor Emmanuel III on 9 May 1946, goes into exile.
1946	10 June	Birth of the Italian Republic: Italy becomes a republic after the results of a popular referendum. The Constituent Assembly is elected to draft the Republican Constitution and women are granted suffrage.
1947		Primo Levi publishes If This Is a Man, based on his experiences in Auschwitz.
1947	10 February	Treaty of Paris between Italy and the Allied Powers, with which Istria, Kvarner, most of the Julian March as well as the Dalmatian city of Zara was annexed by Yugoslavia from Italy causing the Istrian-Dalmatian exodus, which led to the emigration of between 230,000 and 350,000 of local ethnic Italians (Istrian Italians and Dalmatian Italians), the others being ethnic Slovenians, ethnic Croatians, and ethnic Istro-Romanians, choosing to maintain Italian citizenship.
1947		The Festa della Repubblica is established.
1948	18 April	The general election sanctions the supremacy of the Christian Democracy party, and the belonging of Italy to the Western side.
1948	24 November	The film Bicycle Thieves is released.
1948	22 December	The Constitution of the Italian Republic, agreed between Christian-democrats, Socialists and Communists, comes into force.
1949		Italy joins NATO.
1952		Italy becomes a founding member of the European Coal and Steel Community.
1953	10 February	The national oil company ENI (Ente Nazionale Idrocarburi) is established, with Enrico Mattei as his first President. The ENI will become a strong actor in Italian foreign policy towards Arab countries.
1954		The state-owned RAI broadcasts the first Italian official TV program.
1955		The Messina Conference achieves the basic agreement on the European Economic Community
1955		Italy joins the United Nations, along with fifteen other states, after years of stalemate due to opposed vetoes between the United States and the Soviet Union.
1957		The Treaty of Rome founds the European Economic Community.
1958	22 September	Singer-songwriter Andrea Bocelli is born in Lajatico.
1959		Valentino opens his first atelier, in Rome on Via Condotti.
1960		Italian film director Federico Fellini shoots La Dolce Vita, an episodic study of life along Via Veneto in Rome.
1960		Rightist riots in Reggio Calabria against the regional capital being set in Catanzaro.
1960		Leftist riots in Genoa and Reggio Emilia against the Tambroni Cabinet led by Fernando Tambroni, a coalition between DC and post-fascist Italian Social Movement.
1960	25 August	The 1960 Summer Olympics opens in Rome.
1963		The DC switches to a strategy of alliance with the socialist PSI. Electric energy is nationalised and the high school system is reformed.
1963	30 June	Ciaculli massacre: a bomb intended for the mafia boss Salvatore Greco "Ciaschiteddu" explodes in Ciaculli, killing seven police and military officers.
1963	9 October	Two thousand people die when a landslide causes the overtopping of the Vajont Dam north of Venice; the flooding wave completely wipes out several villages.
1964		Singer-songwriter Cristina d'Avena is born.
1964	12 September	Sergio Leone's A Fistful of Dollars, the first of three films in his Dollars Trilogy of Spaghetti Westerns starring Clint Eastwood, is released.
1964		An attempted coup (Piano Solo) is defused.
1964		Michele, the son of Mastro Pietro Ferrero, modifies his father's recipe for the "supercrema gianduja" (invented in 1946) and renames it Nutella.
1965	18 November	The film For a Few Dollars More is released.
1965	8 December	End of Second Vatican Council.
1966	30 October	Socialist and Democratic Socialist Party joined forces in the Unified Socialist Party.
1966	15 December	The film The Good, the Bad and the Ugly is released. The film is now considered to be one of the greatest films of all time.
1968	14 January	The Belice earthquake sequence took place in Sicily between 14 and 15 January. The largest shock measured 5.5 on the moment magnitude scale, with five others of magnitude 5+. The maximum perceived intensity was X (Extreme) on the Mercalli intensity scale. The earthquake sequence, centred between the towns of Gibellina, Salaparuta and Poggioreale, killed at least 231 people, possibly more than 400, with between 632 and about 1,000 injured and left 100,000 homeless.
1968	31 January	The University of Trento is occupied by students.
1968	10 June	The Italy national football team wins its first UEFA European Championship at Rome, against Yugoslavia.
1968	24 June	Giovanni Leone was appointed First Minister: remains in office until December.
1968	2 December	In Sicily clashes between strikers and police.
1968	12 December	Mariano Rumor reconstitutes a center-left government.
1969	July	Published the first issue of Il manifesto (it will become daily in 1971).
1969	4 July	New split the Unified Socialist Party: reborn PSI and PSDI.
1969	September–December	The "Hot Autumn" of 1969 features occupations of factories and universities, and violence between right and left-wing students.
1969	19 November	During the disorders of far-left peoples of lyrical theatre, in Milan, policeman Antonio Annarumma was hit by an iron tube, according to the court inquiry. After his death his vehicle without guidance hit another police officer. Students believe it is the accident which killed him, but this claim was repudiated by the medical examination. Annarumma considered to be the first victim of the Years of Lead, a period of social and political upheaval in Italy.
1969	20 November	Agreement between Italy and Austria for a system of self-government in South Tyrol.
1969	12 December	Far-right terrorists bomb the Banca Nazionale dell'Agricoltura in Milan (Piazza Fontana bombing), killing 17 people and wounding 88. Four more bombs detonate without victims. Investigations are blurred, and no responsible party has been held accountable.
1970	6 August	After the resignation of Mariano Rumor (6 July), Emilio Colombo forms a new Government.
1970	September–October	Serious incidents of violence across Italy.
1970	1 December	Parliament approved the law on divorce.
1970	7–8 December	Another rightist coup attempt is defused (golpe Borghese).
1971	16 February	The regional council of Calabria recognizes Catanzaro regional capital.
1971	February	In Italy resume violent riots.
1971	13 June	Partial local elections showed a decline of the Christian Democrats and an advanced of MSI.
1971	October	The band Pink Floyd films performances for their songs "Echoes", "One of These Days", and "A Saucerful of Secrets" in Pompeii. The footage was included in their concert documentary film Pink Floyd: Live at Pompeii.
1971	24 December	Giovanni Leone is elected President of the Republic at the twenty-third ballot.
1974	12 May	A referendum asking voters to repeal a government law allowing divorce is defeated. The result of Italian divorce referendum, 1974 is the retention of the law allowing divorce.
1975	22 November	The controversial Italian-French art film Salò, or the 120 Days of Sodom, is first released.
1978	16 March	Kidnapping of the former prime minister Aldo Moro by the Red Brigades.
1978	9 May	Aldo Moro is killed after the government refuses to negotiate with the Communist group. The "historic compromise" is stopped and Giulio Andreotti steps down from government. The Red Brigades begin falling apart.
1978	15 June	President Giovanni Leone resigned.
1978	July	Socialist Sandro Pertini is the new President of the Republic.
1979	7 April	Arrest of several academics accused of subversive and terrorist activities.
1979	3–4 June	In the early parliamentary elections fall of PCI, advanced the Radical party and stability of DC.
1979	10–11 June	First election for the European Parliament.
1979	August	First government led by Francesco Cossiga.
1979	December	First transmissions of the third RAI channel, Rai 3.
1980		Umberto Eco publishes The Name of the Rose, a medieval murder mystery.
1980	27 June	Ustica Massacre: a DC-9 operated by Itavia crashes into the Tyrrhenian Sea between Ponza and Ustica, killing all 81 people on board. The disaster led to numerous investigations, legal actions, and accusations, and continues to be a source of speculation, including claims of conspiracy by the Italian government and others.
1980	2 August	Bologna massacre: a terrorist bombing of the Central Station at Bologna kills 85 people and wounds more than 200. This was found to be a neo-fascist bombing, mainly organized by the Nuclei Armati Rivoluzionari: Francesca Mambro and Valerio Fioravanti were sentenced to life imprisonment. In April 2007 the Supreme Court confirmed the conviction of Luigi Ciavardini, a NAR member associated closely with close ties to Terza Posizione. Ciavardini received a 30-year prison sentence for his role in the attack.
1980	September	Broadcaster Canale 5 starts to broadcast on a national scale. This is the first national private television.
1980	23 November	Irpinia earthquake, took place in Southern Italy with a moment magnitude of 6.9 and a maximum Mercalli intensity of X (Extreme). The shock was centered on the village of Conza and left at least 2,483 people dead, at least 7,700 injured, and left 250,000 homeless.
1981	17 March	The prosecutors of Milan and the police discovered the existence of the P2 lodge. Head of loggia is Licio Gelli.
1981	June	Giovanni Spadolini (PRI) is premier of a coalition (PRI-DC-PSI-PSDI-PLI) called Pentapartito. Spadolini is the first non-Christian Democrat minister since 1945. His government lasts one year.
1982	29 May	Parliament approves law on "collaborators of justice". It was officially created the figure of Pentito.
1982	18 June	Roberto Calvi was found hanged in London.
1982	11 July	The Italy national football team wins in Spain its third FIFA World Cup.
1982	3 September	General Carlo Alberto Dalla Chiesa and his wife are killed by the mafia in Palermo.
1983	August	Bettino Craxi (PSI) is premier of a PSI-DC coalition until 1987. Under his government, a television reform allows Berlusconi to build up his media empire. The Concordat with the Vatican is revised, and salary indexation is abolished to curb inflation from 12% to 5%, but public debt raises up to 90% of GDP.
1984	June	At the European Parliament elections, in the wake of the death of the leader Enrico Berlinguer, the PCI gains 33.3% of votes and overcomes the DC as first party in Italy.
1984	23 December	Sicilian Mafia bomb the 904 express train between Bologna and Florence, killing 16 people and wounding 267. Mafia boss Giuseppe Calò, also known as "Pippo", was convicted for ordering and organising the attack in November 1992.
1985		Franco Modigliani receives the Nobel Prize for Economics for his work on household savings and the dynamics of financial markets.
1985	9 June	A referendum on abolishing the wage escalator was defeated by margin of 54.3% to 45.7% on a voter turnout of 77.9% out of 45 million eligible Italian electors.
1985	June	Francesco Cossiga is elected President of the Republic.
1985	27 December	Rome airport is attacked by Palestinian terrorists; 16 people die.
1986		The start of the Maxi Trial against the Sicilian Mafia that took place in Palermo, Sicily. It lasted until 1992 (the final day of the Supreme Court of Cassation). Sicilian prosecutors indicted 475 mafiosi for a multitude of crimes, of which 338 were convicted and sentenced to a total of 2,665 years, not including life sentences handed to 19 bosses. It is considered to be the most significant trial ever against the Sicilian Mafia, as well as the biggest trial in world history.
1986		Italy-US relations are strained by the Libyan retaliation after the American bombing of Tripoli, and by the Sigonella crisis following the kidnapping of the Achille Lauro liner ship by the Palestinian Liberation Front.
1986		The neurologist Rita Levi-Montalcini, together with Stanley Cohen, receives the Nobel Prize in Physiology or Medicine for their discovery of Nerve growth factor (NGF). Since 2001, she has also served in the Italian Senate as a Senator for Life.
1987	July	Giovanni Goria is the new prime minister. His Cabinet lasts up to April 1988.
1987	November	In the wake of the Chernobyl disaster, a referendum put off the use of nuclear plants. The three working plants are slowly decommissioned. The Green party establishes itself in Italy.
1988	April	Ciriaco De Mita replaces Goria as prime minister. His Cabinet lasts one year.
1988	11 June	Former President Giuseppe Saragat dies.
1988	21 June	Achille Occhetto is the new leader of PCI.
1988	14 August	Enzo Ferrari, founder of Ferrari and Scuderia Ferrari, died at the age of 90. Weeks after his death, both Ferrari drivers Gerhard Berger and Michele Alboreto dedicated the 1–2 finish for Enzo at Monza.
1989	30 April	Sergio Leone dies of a heart attack.
1989	22 July	Giulio Andreotti is premier of a coalition until 1992.
1989	October	New Code of Criminal Procedure shall enter into force.
1990	24 February	Former President Sandro Pertini dies.
1990	May	Italian regional elections. Umberto Bossi's Lega Nord obtained a stunning result in the main election of this round of vote, the choice of the Lombard Regional Council.
1990	June–July	Italy hosts the World Football Cup, but loses in the semi-final against Argentina at penalties.
1990	October	Prime Minister Giulio Andreotti reveals the existence of Operation Gladio. Gladio was the codename for a clandestine North Atlantic Treaty Organization (NATO) "stay-behind" operation in Italy during the Cold War. Its purpose was to prepare for, and implement, armed resistance in the event of a Warsaw Pact invasion and conquest. Although Gladio specifically refers to the Italian branch of the NATO stay-behind organizations, "Operation Gladio" is used as an informal name for all of them.
1991	January	Italy takes part in the Operation Desert Storm, during the Gulf War, for the liberation of Kuwait.
1991	3 February	The Italian Communist Party split into the Democratic Party of the Left (PDS), led by Achille Occhetto, and the Communist Refoundation Party (PRC), headed by Armando Cossutta.
1991	9 June	A referendum abolished the multiple preferences for the election of Chamber of Deputies's members, in favor of the single preference.
1991	19 September	A man found frozen high in the Alps is discovered, and is later found to be a Neolithic hunter who lived approximately 5,000 years ago.
1991	1 October	The Simpsons is aired on the Italian TV for the first time.
1992		Mani pulite (clean hands), a nationwide judicial investigation into political corruption and influence-peddling, leads to the fall and dissolution of the Christian Democracy, and of the Socialist party, which had been the most influential political parties in Italy since 1948. Bettino Craxi flees to Tunisia to avoid prosecution.
1992	5–6 April	General elections. Lega Nord's first electoral breakthrough was at the 1990 regional elections, but it was with the 1992 general election that the party emerged as a leading political actor. Having gained 8.7% of the vote, 56 deputies and 26 senators, it became the fourth largest party of the country and within Parliament.
1992	25 April	President Francesco Cossiga resigned.
1992	25 May	Oscar Luigi Scalfaro is elected President of the Republic.
1992	28 June	Giuliano Amato (PSI) is premier of a PSI-DC-PLI-PSDI coalition.
1992	May–July	Giovanni Falcone and Paolo Borsellino, two Italian anti-Mafia magistrates, are assassinated by the mafia.
1992	15 December	Bettino Craxi is under investigation in Milan for corruption.
1993	27 March	Giulio Andreotti is under investigation for collusion with the mafia.
1993	18 April	The public overwhelmingly backed the abrogation of the existing proportional representation parliamentary electoral law in a referendum, for the benefit of a majority system.
1993	21 April	Prime Minister Giuliano Amato resigns.
1993	26 April	Carlo Azeglio Ciampi, former governor of the national bank, was appointed head of the government and appointed a technical government without political influences.
1993	29 April	Italian Parliament denied permission to proceed against Bettino Craxi, accused of corruption. Several members of the government, having been in office just three days, resigned in protest; among them were Francesco Rutelli, Minister of the Environment and Vincenzo Visco, Minister of Finance.
1993	May–July	The Sicilian Mafia organizes some attacks in Rome, Florence and Milan.
1993	4 August	A mixed system was introduced by the Parliament.
1993	August	Parliament grants authorization to proceed against Bettino Craxi.
1994	27 April	Media magnate Silvio Berlusconi becomes prime minister for a rightist coalition. However, the pact between northern autonomists and southern post-fascists collapsed late in the year, and Berlusconi is forced to resign as prime minister.
1994	1 September	The Italian film Il Postino: The Postman premieres at the Venice Film Festival.
1996	17 May	Romano Prodi becomes prime minister for the Olive Tree coalition, voted into power with the external support of the communists.
1996	31 December	The Tricolour Day is established.
1997		Valentino Rossi wins his first World Championship at the 1997 Grand Prix motorcycle racing season.
1997	October	Dario Fo, an Italian avant-garde playwright, manager-director, and actor-mime, is awarded the Nobel Prize for Literature. A theatrical caricaturist with a flair for social agitation, he has often faced government censure.
1997	20 December	Roberto Benigni's film Life Is Beautiful is released.
1998	3 February	20 skiers (of which 3 Italians) die in the Cavalese cable car disaster, when a US EA-6B Prowler military jet severed the cables supporting the Cermis mountain cable car. Pilots will be later found not guilty by an American court.
1999	1 January	Italy is accepted in the eurozone.
1999	21 March	The film Life is Beautiful is nominated for seven Academy Awards. The film wins the awards for Best Actor (the first for a male performer in a non-English-speaking role, and only the third overall acting Oscar for non-English-speaking roles), the Best Original Dramatic Score and the Oscar for Best Foreign Language Film.
1999	24 March	Italy takes part in the Kosovo War, a NATO-led aerial operation against Milosevic's Yugoslavia to prevent genocide in Kosovo. The premier is Massimo D'Alema, of the post-communist Partito Democratico della Sinistra.
1999	13 May	Carlo Azeglio Ciampi is elected President of the Republic.
2000	20 January	Bettino Craxi dies at Hammamet, Tunisia.

== 21st century ==
Year	Date	Event
2001	11 June	Berlusconi's second term as prime minister begins.
2001	20 July	Violence erupts at the G8 demonstrations in Genoa. The police are accused of severe abuses; one demonstrator is shot dead.
2001	October	Italy takes part in the Afghanistan War.
2001	November	Former President Giovanni Leone dies.
2002	1 January	The euro begins circulating as new official currency of Italy.
2003	March	Italy takes part in the Iraq War, although populations show disapproval through peace flags.
2004	30 March	It is established the National Memorial Day of the Exiles and Foibe.
2005	4 March	Nicola Calipari, Italian secret agent, is shot dead by friendly fire from a US patrol during the rescue of journalist Giuliana Sgrena from kidnappers in Baghdad. US later refused the extradition of the identified shooter, Mario Lozano.
2006	10 February	The 2006 Winter Olympics are held in Turin (to 26 February).
2006	17 May	Prodi's second term as prime minister begins.
2006	9 July	The Italy national football team wins its fourth FIFA World Cup in Germany.
2006	September	Italy's engagement is pivotal in the deployment of the UNIFIL peace force after the 2006 Lebanon War.
2006	December	Italian government withdraws its troops from Iraq, ending the Operation Ancient Babylon.
2008		Berlusconi's third term as prime minister begins.
2009	6 April	An earthquake strikes L'Aquila, causing the death of 307 people and making about 65,000 homeless.
2010	August	Former President Francesco Cossiga dies.
2012	January	Former president Oscar Luigi Scalfaro dies.
2013	6 May	Former prime minister Giulio Andreotti dies at 94 years old in Rome.
2015	January	President Giorgio Napolitano resigns.
2015	31 January	Sergio Mattarella is the new President of the Italian Republic.
2016	September	Former President Carlo Azeglio Ciampi died in Rome.
2018	4 March	Italian general election, 2018
2020	February	COVID-19 pandemic hits Italy among the first countries in Europe. COVID-19 virus originated in China, spreads in Italy without being clearly detected in the winter of 2019.
2020	March	In March 2020, the government imposed a national quarantine as a measure to limit the spread of the coronavirus pandemic in the country. Later that month, Italy became the country with the highest total number of deaths in the worldwide coronavirus pandemic.
2020	December	On 27 December 2020, the COVID-19 vaccination campaign in Italy starts. The first Pfizer - BioNTech COVID-19 vaccines are sent to Italy.
2021	February	Mario Draghi appointed Prime Minister.
2022	July	2022 Italian government crisis.
2022	25 September	Italian general election, 2022
2022	22 October	Giorgia Meloni appointed Prime Minister, the first woman to hold this position.

== See also ==
- Category:Timelines of cities in Italy

== Bibliography ==
- Thomas Bartlett (1841). "Italy". New Tablet of Memory; or, Chronicle of Remarkable Events. London: Thomas Kelly.
- J. Willoughby Rosse (1858). "Italy". Index of Dates ... Facts in the Chronology and History of the World. London: H.G. Bohn. hdl:2027/uva.x030807786 – via HathiTrust.
- George Henry Townsend (1867), "Italy", A Manual of Dates (2nd ed.), London: Frederick Warne & Co.
- William Henry Overall, ed. (1870). "Italy". Dictionary of Chronology. London: William Tegg. hdl:2027/uc2.ark:/13960/t9m32q949.
- Alfredo Comandini [in Italian] (29 November 2023). L'Italia nei cento anni del secolo XIX (1801–1900): giorno per giorno (in Italian). Milan: Antonio Vallardi Editore. OCLC 2899668. 1900–1942. (Chronology)
- Charles E. Little (1900), "Italy", Cyclopedia of Classified Dates, New York: Funk & Wagnalls
- Henry Smith Williams, ed. (1908). "Chronological Résumé of Italian History". Italy. Historians' History of the World. Vol. 9. London: Hooper & Jackson. hdl:2027/njp.32101063964868.
- Benjamin Vincent (1910), "Italy", Haydn's Dictionary of Dates (25th ed.), London: Ward, Lock & Co.
- Zygmunt G. Baranski and Rebecca J. West, ed. (2001). "Chronology". Cambridge Companion to Modern Italian Culture. Cambridge University Press. ISBN 978-0-521-55982-9.
- Roy Domenico (2002). "Chronology". Regions of Italy: a Reference Guide to History and Culture. Greenwood. ISBN 978-0313307331.
- "Italy: Chronology". Western Europe. Regional Surveys of the World (5th ed.). Europa Publications. 2003. pp. 357–361. ISBN 978-1-85743-152-0.
- Mark Gilbert; Robert K. Nilsson (2007). "Chronology". Historical Dictionary of Modern Italy. Scarecrow Press. ISBN 978-0-8108-6428-3.
- Guggenheim Museum (2014). "Time Line". Italian Futurism, 1909–1944. New York.
- Michael Wyatt, ed. (2014). "Timeline". Cambridge Companion to the Italian Renaissance. Cambridge University Press. p. xxi+. ISBN 978-1-139-99167-4.
