= 1120s BC =

The 1120s BC is a decade that lasted from 1129 BC to 1120 BC.

== Events and trends ==
- 1127/6 BC—Thymoetes, legendary King of Athens, dies childless after a reign of 9 years. He is succeeded by his designated heir Melanthus of Pylos, son of Andropompus, who had reportedly assisted him in battle against the Boeotians.
- 1122 BC—Legendary founding of Pyongyang
- 1122 BC—Legendary founding emigration of Gija to Gija Joseon.
- c. 1120 BC—Destruction of Troy VIIb1.
