= Armenius =

Son of Zeuxippus in Greek myth

In Greek mythology, Armenius (Ancient Greek: Ἀρμένιος, romanized: Harménios) or Harmenius was the son of Zeuxippus, son of King Eumelus of Pherae. He was the father of Henioche, mother of Melanthus by Andropompus.
