= 1130s BC =

The 1130s BC is a decade that lasted from 1139 BC to 1130 BC.

== Events and trends ==
- C.1136 BC—Ramesses VII begins his reign as the sixth ruler of the Twentieth Dynasty of Egypt.
- 1135 BC—Oxyntes, legendary King of Athens, dies after a reign of 12 years and is succeeded by his eldest son Apheidas.
- 1134 BC—Apheidas, legendary King of Athens, is assassinated and succeeded by his younger brother Thymoetes after a reign of 1 year.

== Significant people ==
- Ramesses XI, pharaoh of Egypt, is born (approximate date).
