= Penthilus (son of Periclymenus) =

King of Messenia in Greek mythology

In Greek mythology, Penthilus (/ˈpɛnθɪləs/; Ancient Greek: Πένθιλος, romanized: Pénthilos) was a king of Messenia, son of Periclymenus and father of Borus. In early accounts, he was the son of Borus and Lysidice instead. Penthilus married Anchirhoe and became the father of Andropompus, father of King Melanthus of Athens.
