= 1150s BC =

Decade

The 1150s BC is a decade that lasted from 1159 BC to 1150 BC.

== Events and trends ==
- 1159 BC—The Hekla 3 eruption triggers an 18-year period of climatic worsening. (estimated date, disputed)
- 1154 BC—Death of King Menelaus of Sparta (estimated date), thirty years after the traditional date for the Fall of Troy in the Homeric Trojan War.
- 1154 BC—Medinet Habu (temple): records a people called the P-r-s-t (conventionally Peleset) among those who fought with Egypt in Ramesses III's reign.
- 1152 BC, 14 November—First historically confirmed workers' strike, under Pharaoh Ramses III in ancient Egypt.
- 1150 BC—Demophon, King of Athens and veteran of the Trojan War, dies after a reign of 33 years and is succeeded by his son Oxyntes.

== Significant people ==
- 1153 BC—Death of pharaoh Ramesses III of Egypt
- Nebuchadnezzar I, king of Babylon, is born (approximate date).
