= Melaenae =

Ancient border deme or location in Attica

Melaenae or Melainai (Ancient Greek: Μέλαιναι) was a fortified deme of ancient Attica, on the frontier of Boeotia, celebrated in Attic mythology as the place for which Melanthus and Xanthus fought. It was sometimes called Celaenae or Kelainai (Κέλαιναι).

Its site is unlocated.
