= 1190s BC =

The 1190s BC is a decade that lasted from 1199 BC to 1190 BC.

== Events and trends ==
- 1197 BC—The beginning of the first period (1197 BC–982 BC) according to Shao Yong's concept of the I Ching and history.
- 1194 BC—The beginning of the legendary Trojan War.
- c. 1192 BC—Wu Ding, king of the Shang dynasty, dies in the fifty-ninth year of his reign, and is succeeded by his son Zu Geng.
- 1191 BC—Menestheus, legendary King of Athens, dies during the Trojan War after a reign of 23 years and is succeeded by his nephew Demophon, a son of Theseus. Other accounts place his death a decade later and shortly after the Trojan War (see 1180s BC).

== Significant people ==
- Amenemses, Pharaoh of the Nineteenth Dynasty of Egypt (1202 BC–1199 BC)
