= Zeuxippus (mythology) =

In Greek mythology, the name Zeuxippus (Ancient Greek: Ζεύξιππος) may refer to:

- Zeuxippus of Sicyon, son of Apollo.
- Zeuxippus, a prince of Pherae as the son of King Eumelus and possibly, Iphthime, daughter of Icarius of Sparta. He was the father of Armenius, himself father of Henioche.
