= Henioche =

Name in Greek mythology

In Greek mythology, the name Henioche (/hɛˈnaɪ.əkiː/; Ancient Greek: Ἡνιόχη, fem. of ἠνίοχος) may refer to:

- Henioche, surname of Hera in Lebadea.
- Henioche or Eniocha, wife of King Creon of Thebes according to some authors, more commonly known as Eurydice. She was probably the mother of Menoeceus (Megareus), Lycomedes, Haemon, and Pyrrha.
- Henioche, daughter of Creon by either the above Henioche or Eurydice. She was probably the sister of Menoeceus, Lycomedes, Haemon, and Pyrrha. Together with the latter, there were statues erected for them at the entrance of the sanctuary of Apollo Ismenius in Thebes.
- Henioche, daughter of Pittheus, thus a sister of Aethra. She was the mother of the bandit Sciron or Sinis by Canethus.
- Henioche, daughter of Armenius, the descendant of Admetus. She was the consort of Andropompus and mother by him of Melanthus, who in his turn was father of Codrus.
- Henioche, the wet nurse of Medea, according to Valerius Flaccus.
- Henioche or Heniocheia could be the correct form behind Henicea in Hyginus' catalogue of Priam's children.
