= 1180s BC =

The 1180s BC is a decade that lasted from 1189 BC to 1180 BC.

== Events and trends ==
- 1188 BC — End of the Nineteenth dynasty of Egypt, start of the Twentieth Dynasty.
- 1184 BC — April 24, the traditional date of the fall of Troy.
- 1182 BC — A desperate letter of Ammurapi, the last king of Ugarit, reporting the approaching fleet of the Peoples of the Sea. Shortly thereafter they destroyed both Ugarit and Alasiya (Cyprus).
- 1181 BC — Menestheus, legendary King of Athens and veteran of the Trojan War, dies after a reign of 23 years and is succeeded by his nephew Demophon, a son of Theseus. Other accounts place his death a decade earlier and during the Trojan War (see 1190s BC).
- c. 1180 BC — Invaders raze Hattusa, causing the collapse of the Hittite Empire.
