= 332 =

332 in various calendars
| Gregorian calendar | 332; CCCXXXII |
| Ab urbe condita | 1085 |
| Assyrian calendar | 5082 |
| Balinese saka calendar | 253–254 |
| Bengali calendar | −262 – −261 |
| Berber calendar | 1282 |
| Buddhist calendar | 876 |
| Burmese calendar | −306 |
| Byzantine calendar | 5840–5841 |
| Chinese calendar | 辛卯年 (Metal Rabbit); 3029 or 2822 — to — 壬辰年 (Water Dragon); 3030 or 2823 |
| Coptic calendar | 48–49 |
| Discordian calendar | 1498 |
| Ethiopian calendar | 324–325 |
| Hebrew calendar | 4092–4093 |
- Hindu calendars
| Vikram Samvat | 388–389 |
| Shaka Samvat | 253–254 |
| Kali Yuga | 3432–3433 |
| Holocene calendar | 10332 |
| Iranian calendar | 290 BP – 289 BP |
| Islamic calendar | 299 BH – 298 BH |
| Javanese calendar | 213–214 |
| Julian calendar | 332; CCCXXXII |
| Korean calendar | 2665 |
| Minguo calendar | 1580 before ROC 民前1580年 |
| Nanakshahi calendar | −1136 |
| Seleucid era | 643/644 AG |
| Thai solar calendar | 874–875 |
| Tibetan calendar | ལྕགས་མོ་ཡོས་ལོ་ (female Iron-Hare); 458 or 77 or −695 — to — ཆུ་ཕོ་འབྲུག་ལོ་ (male Water-Dragon); 459 or 78 or −694 |

Year 332 (CCCXXXII) was a leap year starting on Saturday of the Julian calendar. At the time, it was known as the Year of the Consulship of Pacatianus and Hilarianus (or, less frequently, year 1085 Ab urbe condita). The denomination 332 for this year has been used since the early medieval period, when the Anno Domini calendar era became the prevalent method in Europe for naming years.

== Events ==
=== By place ===
==== Roman Empire ====
- Emperor Constantine I and his son Constantine II, aged 16, defeat the Goths in Moesia. The Goths become Roman allies and protect the Danube frontier.
- Constantine I continues construction of a bridge (in imitation of Trajan and his architect Apollodorus of Damascus) across the Danube, for forward-staging grounds for planned campaigns against local tribes.
- May 18 – Constantine I announces a free distribution of food to the citizens in Constantinople, similar to the food given out in the city of Rome. The amount is approximately 80,000 rations a day, doled out from 117 distribution points around the city.

== Births ==
- Saint Monica, Christian saint and mother of Augustine of Hippo (d. 387)

== Deaths ==
- Basilina, wife of Julius Constantius and the mother of Roman Emperor Julian
