= 980s BC =

Decade

The 980s BC is a decade that lasted from 989 BC to 980 BC.

== Events and trends ==
- 984 BC — Osorkon the Elder succeeds Amenemope as king of Egypt.
- 982 BC — The end of first period (1197 BC–982 BC) by Sau Yung's concept of the I Ching and history.
- c. 980 BC — The kingdom of Dʿmt is founded in Eritrea and northern Ethiopia.
