= Borus =

In Greek mythology, the name Borus (Ancient Greek: Βῶρος) may refer to:

- Borus, son of Perieres, who married Polydora, daughter of Peleus and Antigone.
- Borus, a descendant of Nestor. More precisely, he was either a son of Penthilus and grandson of Periclymenus, or son of Periclymenus and father of Penthilus by Lysidice. Through Andropompus, his son or grandson, he was the grandfather or great-grandfather of Melanthus who was one of those who expelled Tisamenus from Lacedaemon and Argos.<re
