= 387 =

387 in various calendars
- Gregorian calendar: 387; CCCLXXXVII
- Ab urbe condita: 1140
- Assyrian calendar: 5137
- Balinese saka calendar: 308–309
- Bengali calendar: −207 – −206
- Berber calendar: 1337
- Buddhist calendar: 931
- Burmese calendar: −251
- Byzantine calendar: 5895–5896
- Chinese calendar: 丙戌年 (Fire Dog); 3084 or 2877 — to — 丁亥年 (Fire Pig); 3085 or 2878
- Coptic calendar: 103–104
- Discordian calendar: 1553
- Ethiopian calendar: 379–380
- Hebrew calendar: 4147–4148
- Hindu calendars
- Vikram Samvat: 443–444
- Shaka Samvat: 308–309
- Kali Yuga: 3487–3488
- Holocene calendar: 10387
- Iranian calendar: 235 BP – 234 BP
- Islamic calendar: 242 BH – 241 BH
- Javanese calendar: 270–271
- Julian calendar: 387; CCCLXXXVII
- Korean calendar: 2720
- Minguo calendar: 1525 before ROC 民前1525年
- Nanakshahi calendar: −1081
- Seleucid era: 698/699 AG
- Thai solar calendar: 929–930
- Tibetan calendar: མེ་ཕོ་ཁྱི་ལོ་ (male Fire-Dog); 513 or 132 or −640 — to — མེ་མོ་ཕག་ལོ་ (female Fire-Boar); 514 or 133 or −639

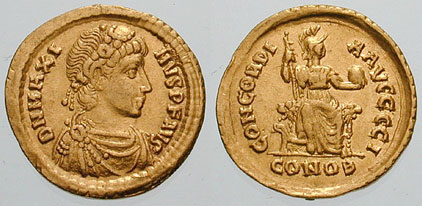
Solidus of Emperor Magnus Maximus

Year 387 (CCCLXXXVII) was a common year starting on Friday of the Julian calendar. At the time, it was known in Rome as the Year of the Consulship of Augustus and Eutropius (or, less frequently, year 1140 Ab urbe condita). The denomination 387 for this year has been used since the early medieval period, when the Anno Domini calendar era became the prevalent method in Europe for naming years.

== Events ==
=== By place ===
==== Roman Empire ====
- Spring – Emperor Theodosius I increases the taxes in Antioch. A peasant uprising leads to a riot, and public buildings are set afire. Theodosius sends imperial troops to quell the disturbance, and closes the public baths and theatres.
- Magnus Maximus, usurping emperor of the West, invades Italy. Emperor Valentinian II, age 16, is forced out of Rome. He flees with his mother Justina and sisters to Thessaloniki (Thrace).
- Winter – The widowed emperor Theodosius I takes Valentinian II under his protection, and marries his sister Flavia Galla.

==== Persia ====
- Peace of Acilisene: King Shapur III signs a treaty with Theodosius I. Armenia is divided in two kingdoms, and becomes a vassal state of the Roman Empire and Persia.

=== By topic ===
==== Art and Science ====
- Oribase, Greek doctor, publishes a treatise on paralysis and bleedings.

==== Religion ====
- Augustine is baptized on Easter Vigil by Saint Ambrose, Bishop of Milan.

== Births ==
- Vardan Mamikonian, Armenian military leader (d. 451)

== Deaths ==
- Aelia Flaccilla, Roman Empress and wife of Theodosius I
- Alatheus, chieftain of the Ostrogoths
- Saint Monica, mother of Augustine of Hippo
- Zhu Fatai, Chinese Buddhist scholar (b. 320)
