= Hekla 3 eruption =

Severe eruption of around 1000 BC

- Volcano: Hekla
- Date: c. 1000 BC
- Type: Plinian
- Location: Iceland; 63°59′N 19°42′W
- Volume: 7.3 km^{3} (1.8 cu mi)
- VEI: 5
- Impact: Caused worldwide temperatures to drop for 18 years
- Hekla on the map of Iceland

The Hekla 3 eruption (H-3) c. 1000 BC is considered the most severe eruption of Hekla during the Holocene. It threw about 7.3 cubic kilometres (1.8 cu mi) of volcanic rock into the atmosphere, placing its Volcanic Explosivity Index (VEI) at 5. This would have caused a volcanic winter, cooling temperatures in the Northern Hemisphere for several years afterwards.

An eighteen-year span of global cooling that is recorded in Irish bog oaks has been attributed to H-3. The eruption is detectable in Greenland ice cores, the bristlecone pine sequence, and the Irish oak sequence of extremely narrow growth rings. Andy Baker's team of researchers dated it to 1021 BC ±130.

A "high chronology" (earlier) interpretation of the above results is preferred by Baker, based also on growth of stalagmites. In Sutherland, northwest Scotland, a spurt of four years of doubled annual luminescent growth banding of calcite in a stalagmite is datable to 1135 BC ±130.

A rival, "low-chronology" interpretation of the eruption has been made by Andrew Dugmore: 2879 BP (929 BC ±34). In 1999, Dugmore suggested a non-volcanic explanation for the Scottish results. In 2000 skepticism concerning conclusions about connecting Hekla 3 and Hekla 4 (probably 2310 BC ±20) with paleoenvironmental events and archaeologically attested abandonment of settlement sites in northern Scotland was expressed by John P. Grattan and David D. Gilbertson. Some Egyptologists have firmly dated the eruption to 1159 BC, and blamed it for famines under Ramesses III during the wider Bronze Age collapse. Dugmore has rebutted this dating based on calculation of solifluction, knocking the date down to 900 BC. An earlier study on bog-oak tree rings by another geologist, John Grattan, adds some weight to the other side of the argument noting a shrinking tree-rings and disappearing tree species during this period. Other scholars have held off on this dispute, preferring the neutral and vague "3000 BP".

== See also ==
- Geography of Iceland
- Iceland plume
- Iceland hotspot
- List of volcanoes in Iceland
- Volcanism of Iceland
