= Andropompus =

In Greek mythology, Andropompus (Ancient Greek: Ἀνδρόπομπος) was one of the descendants of Neleus, king of Thessaly, as son of Penthilus and Anchirhoe. He was the father of King Melanthus of Athens.

== See also ==
- Borus
- Lebedus
- Seferihisar
- Xanthus
