= 1200s BC (decade) =

The 1200s BC is a decade that lasted from 1209 BC to 1200 BC.

== Events and trends ==
- 1207 BC
  - Pharaoh Merneptah claims a victory over Libyans and Sea Peoples at the Battle of Perire.
  - October 30 – Earliest known dateable solar eclipse.
- 1206 BC: Approximate starting date of Late Bronze Age collapse, a period of migration, unrest and destruction in the eastern Mediterranean and Ancient Near East, and beginning of the Iron Age in the Near East.
- 1204 BC: Theseus, legendary King of Athens, is deposed after a reign of 30 years and succeeded by Menestheus, great-grandson of Erichthonius II of Athens and second cousin of Theseus' father Aegeus. Menestheus is reportedly assisted by Castor and Polydeuces of Sparta, who want to reclaim their sister Helen from her first husband Theseus. Theseus seeks refuge in Skyros, whose King Lycomedes is an old friend and ally. Lycomedes, however, considers his visitor a threat to the throne and proceeds to assassinate him. (Other accounts place these events a decade earlier. See 1210s BC.)
- c. 1200 BC: Start of Pan-Illyrians
- c. 1200 BC: Collapse of Hittite power in Anatolia with the destruction of their capital Hattusa.
- c. 1200 BC: The Israelite highland settlement takes place, with a notable increase in the settled population in the hills north of Jerusalem during this time.
- c. 1200 BC: Massive migrations of people around the Mediterranean and the Middle-East. See Sea People for more information.
- c. 1200 BC: Aramaic nomads and Chaldeans become a big threat to the former Babylonian and Assyrian Empire.
- c. 1200 BC: Migration and expansion of Dorian Greeks. Destruction of Mycenaean city Pylos.
- c. 1200 BC: Final destruction of the major Mycenian city excavated at Iklaina.
- c. 1200 BC: The Cimmerians are conjectured to have started settling the steppes of southern Russia.
- c. 1200 BC: The proto-Scythian Srubna (Timber-grave) culture expands from the lower Volga region to cover the whole of the North Pontic area.
- c. 1200 BC: Olmec culture starts and thrives in Mesoamerica.
- c. 1200 BC: San Lorenzo Tenochtitlán starts to flourish.
- c. 1200 BC: Ancestral Puebloan civilization in North America. (approximate date)
- c. 1200 BC: Possible battle in the Tollense River Valley of northern Germany.

c. 1200 BC: The Yajurveda is composed.

== Births ==
- C. 1203 BC: Obed, son of Boaz, father of Jesse, and grandfather of David, was born

== Literature ==
- Tale of Two Brothers from the Egyptian Papyrus D’Orbiney by the scribe Ennana.
