= Demophon of Athens =

Athenian king in Greek mythology

Demophon
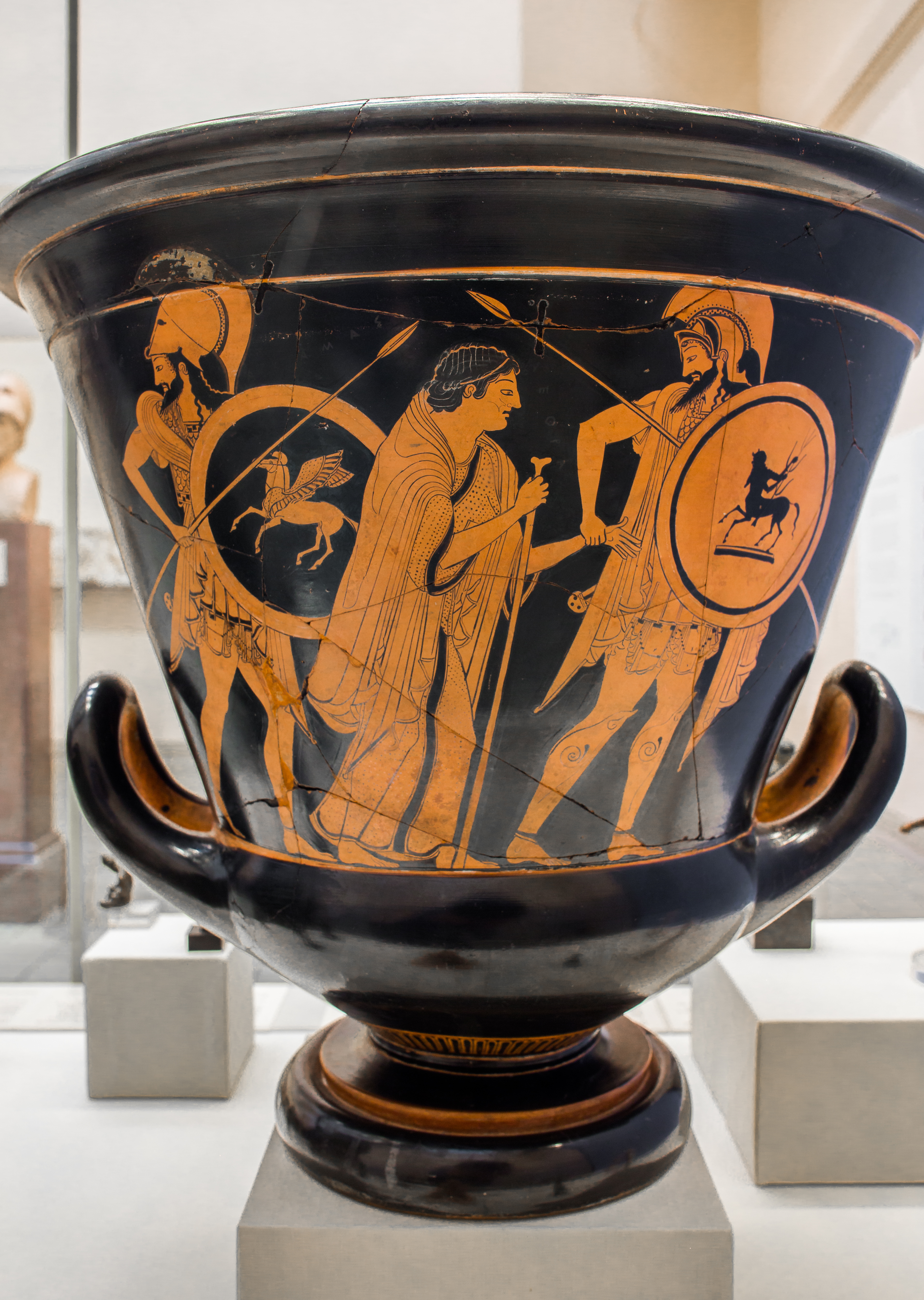
- Acamas and Demophon free Aethra, 5th-century red-figure calyx krater in the British Museum

King of Athens
- Reign: 1183 B.C. – 1150 B.C.
- Predecessor: Menestheus
- Successor: Oxyntes
- Born: Unknown; Athens, Greece
- Died: 1150 B.C. Athens, Greece
- Wives: Phyllis; Unknown
- Issue: Oxyntes
- Father: Theseus
- Mother: Phaedra or Iope
- Military career
- Allegiance: Achaeans
- Service years: 1193 B.C. – 1183 B.C.
- Conflicts: Trojan War

In Greek mythology, Demophon /ˈdɛməfɒn, -fən/ (Ancient Greek: Δημοφῶν or Δημοφόων), also spelled Demophoon, was a legendary veteran of the Trojan War and king of Athens. The son of Theseus and Phaedra, Demophon was raised in exile by a family friend after his father was deposed. He later fought in the Trojan War, being one of those who hid in the Trojan Horse. Following the fall of Troy and the rescue of his grandmother Aethra, Demophon is said to have landed in Thrace on his return journey, where he met and married Phyllis, the daughter of the king. Leaving for Athens, Demophon promised to return, and when he did not, Phyllis committed suicide in despair. Arriving in Athens after a possible stop in Cyprus, Demophon succeeded Menestheus as king of Athens, supposedly in 1183 B.C. As king, he gave refuge and land to the Heracleidae in Athens, fought Diomedes and wrested the Palladium from him, presided over the creation of the court of the Ephetae, and hosted Orestes during his madness. Demophon died in Athens in 1150 B.C. after a reign of 33 years, and was succeeded by his son Oxyntes.

== Mythology ==
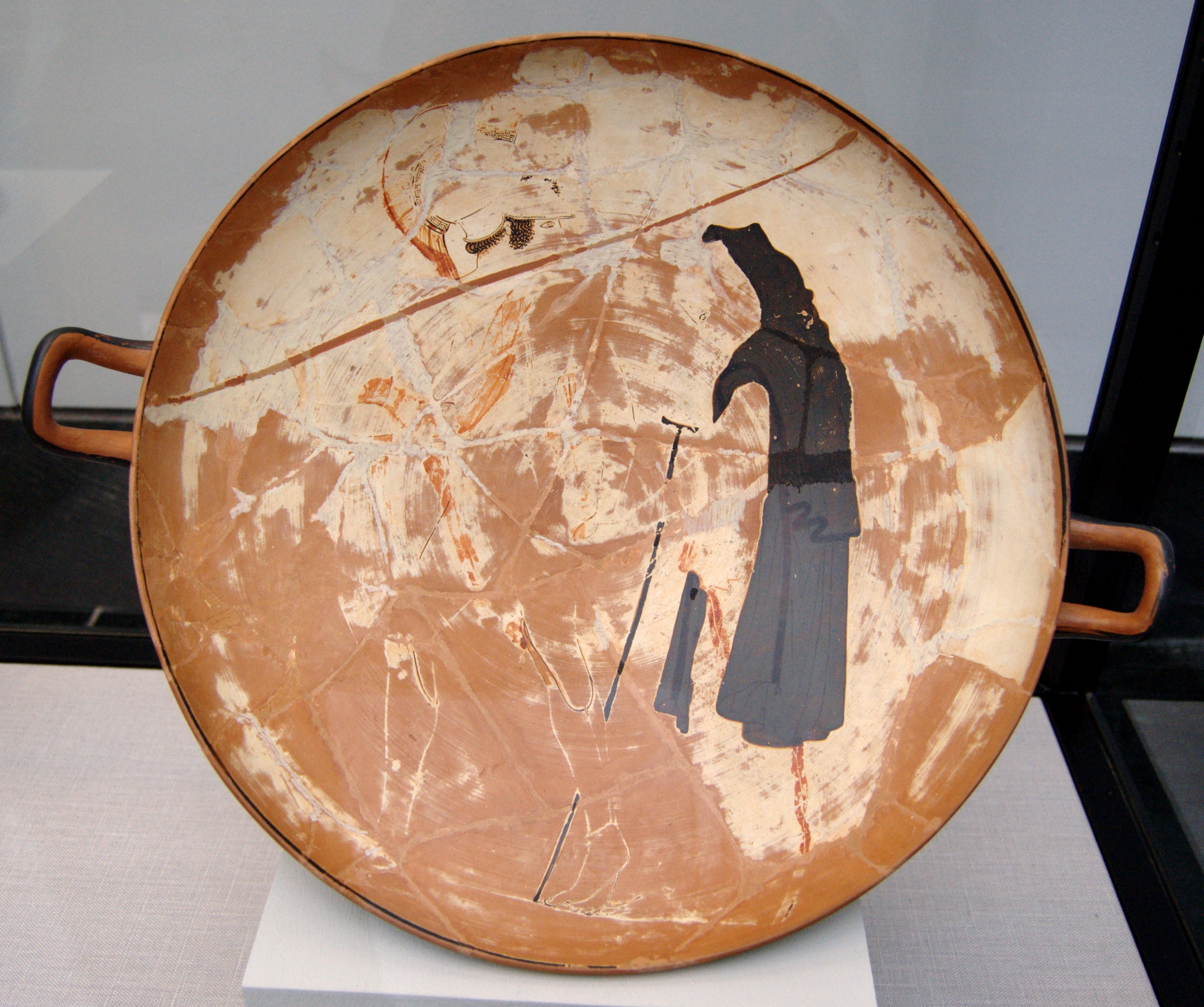
Demophon freeing Aethra, Attic white-ground kylix, 470–460 BC, Staatliche Antikensammlungen (Inv. 2687)

=== Early life and family ===
According to Pindar, Demophon was the son of Theseus (the son of Aethra and King of Aegeus of Athens or Poseidon) and Phaedra, or Iope, daughter of Iphicles, which would make Demophon a relative of Heracles. Demophon was the brother of Acamas. Demophon had half siblings as well, including Hippolytus and Melanippus. Demophon was born during the reign of his father, Theseus, as king of Athens. Phaedra, his mother, committed suicide after it was discovered that her claim of rape by Hippolytus was false.

After journeying to the underworld with his friend, Pirithous, Theseus lost the throne of Athens upon his return to Menestheus, supposedly in 1205 B.C. Consequently, Demophon and Acamas were exiled to Euboea, where they grew up under the care of Elephenor, a relative by marriage. Theseus went into exile as well, until he was murdered by being thrown off a cliff on Scyros by Lycomedes.

=== Trojan war ===
When the Trojan War (said to have taken place from 1193 B.C. to 1183 B.C.) broke out, Demophon joined the Achaeans, led by King Agamemnon of Mycenae, however, he is not mentioned by Homer. The Athenians were led in battle by Menestheus. When Troy fell, he was among those who entered the city in the Trojan Horse. During the Fall of Troy, after making their intentions known to Agamemnon, Demophon and Acamas freed their grandmother Aethra, Helen's handmaid who had been captured by the Dioscuri while Theseus was in the underworld years before, and brought her home. Shortly thereafter, however, Aethra committed suicide after learning of the death of her son Theseus decades before. Demophon survived the war; however, as with other Achaean leaders, his return journey was not simple.

=== Thrace and Cyprus ===
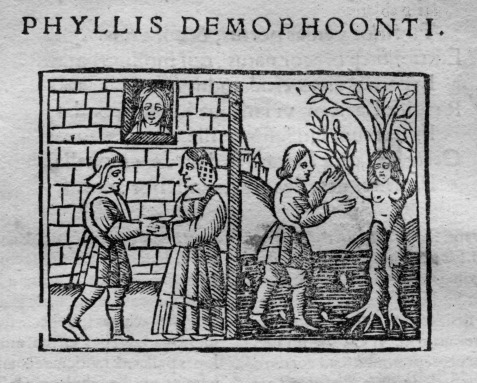
Early 16th century woodcut of Phyllis and Demophon

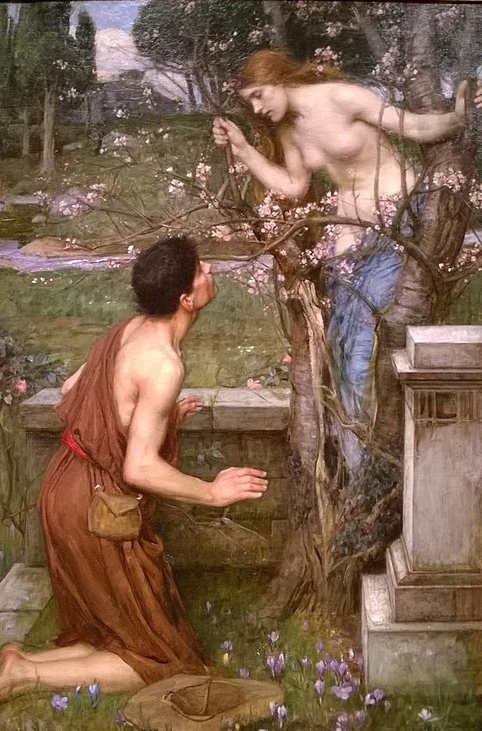
Late 19th century depiction of Phyllis and Demophon by John William Waterhouse.

According to some sources, Demophon, stopping in Thrace on his return journey from the Trojan War, married Phyllis, daughter of a Thracian king (possibly Sithon). On the day after the wedding, however, he decided to complete his voyage and sail to Athens, promising to return to Thrace and take Phyllis with him as soon as possible. She gave him a casket and told not to open it unless he should lose every hope to return to Thrace.

Demophon, according to some traditions, eventually stopped in or even settled in Cyprus and forgot about Phyllis. She would come to the sea shore every day, expecting to see the sails of his ship, but in vain. After the appointed date was past, she either died of grief or hanged herself. One day, according to some versions of the story, Demophon opened the casket out of curiosity; what he saw there was so horrifying that he jumped onto his horse and rode like wild till he fell off the horse on his own sword and died. Others, however, say that he did return to Thrace, but Phyllis was already dead by the time; when he embraced the lifeless almond tree into which she was said to have transformed after death, it started to blossom.

Lucian relates this story concerning not Demophon, but his brother Acamas. Tzetzes echoes this. Acamas is better known for having been loved by Laodice, daughter of Priam, and to have fathered Munitus by her. However, it has been said by Plutarch that Demophon was in fact the lover of Laodice and father of Munitus. Munitus, who was raised by his great-grandmother Aethra, later died of snakebite while hunting in Thrace.

=== King of Athens ===
Not all sources, however, accepted the tradition of Demophon's death in Cyprus, stating he was one of the few heroes fortunate enough to return home safely. In Euripides' play Heracleidae, and in other sources, Demophon became king of Athens, having succeeded Menestheus after the latter's death (said to have occurred in 1183 B.C.). In the play, Demophon granted the children of Heracles, fleeing from Eurystheus, refuge and land in Athens. As Eurystheus prepared to attack, an oracle told Demophon that he would win if and only if a noble virgin was sacrificed to Persephone. Macaria, a daughter of Heracles, volunteered for the sacrifice and a spring was named the Macarian spring in her honor.

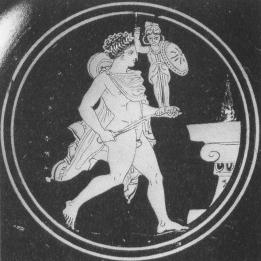
Depiction of Diomedes with the Palladium

Another tale has been related of Demophon pertaining to the hero Diomedes, or, in other versions, Agamemnon. The story goes that, one night, Diomedes landed on the coast of Attica after a storm and, after failing to recognize the land, began ravaging it. King Demophon marched out against the invaders, and, after the Athenians slew numerous Argives, was successful enough to wrest the Palladium from Diomedes, who had taken it from Troy. However, in the confusion of the nighttime fray, the king accidentally killed a fellow Athenian by trampling him with his horse. Shortly thereafter, the court of the Ephetae was established by Demophon, with the initial purpose of trying himself for his crime. This tribunal would later be given jurisdiction over all murder cases. The tribunal was made up of 50 Athenians, as well as 50 Argives, all aged upwards of 50. Demophon submitted himself as the first person to be tried by the court, with the verdict of his case being unknown, nevertheless, he continued on as King of Athens.

Later, Orestes, seeking asylum after avenging his father, Agamemnon, by murdering his mother and her lover, arrived in Athens during Demophon's reign. As Orestes arrived during the celebration of the Anthesteria, precautions were taken by the king that he would not pollute the sacred rights, resulting in the second day of the festival, called Choes. Orestes was tried at Athens by the Erinyes, and was acquitted by Athena's tiebreaking vote, although his madness continued.

=== Death and succession ===
Demophon is said to have died in Athens in 1150 B.C. after a reign of 33 years, and was succeeded by his son Oxyntes. Oxyntes was succeeded by his son Apheidas in 1136 B.C., who was succeeded by his brother Thymoetes in 1135 B.C. after his assassination. Thymoetes was deposed in 1127 B.C. by Melanthus, a Neleid. Thus, Demophon's dynasty held onto power for only 23 years after Demophon's death.

Regnal titles
Preceded by Menestheus	King of Athens; 1183 B.C. - 1150 B.C.	Succeeded by Oxyntes
