= Thymoetes =

Set of mythological Greek characters

In Greek mythology, there were at least three people named Thymoetes (/θɪˈmiːtiz/; Ancient Greek: Θυμοίτης Thumoítēs).

- Thymoetes, one of the elders of Troy (also spelled Thymoetus) and also a Trojan prince as the son of King Laomedon. A soothsayer, had predicted that, on a certain day, a boy would be born by whom Troy would be destroyed. On that very day Paris was born to King Priam of Troy, and Munippus to Thymoetes's wife, Cilla. Priam ordered Munippus and his mother Cilla to be killed in order to prevent the prophecy, whilst sparing his son by Hecuba, Paris. It is possible that Thymoetes advised the Trojans to take the wooden horse into the city as revenge.
- Thymoetes, an Athenian hero, son of Oxyntes, king of Attica. He was the last Athenian king descended from Theseus. He was succeeded by Melanthus (according to Pausanias, overthrown by him).
- Thymoetes, a Trojan and a companion of Aeneas, who was slain by Turnus.
- Thymoetes, another spelling of Dimoetes.

Regnal titles
Preceded by Apheidas	King of Athens	Succeeded by Melanthus
