= Neleides =

Neleides or Nelides (/ˈniːliɪdz/ NEEL-ee-idz; Ancient Greek: Nηλείδης; also Neleiades, Νηληιάδης, and Neleius), in the plural Neleidae (Ancient Greek: Νηλεῖδαι), was a patronymic of ancient Greece derived from Neleus, son of the Greek god Poseidon, and was used to refer to his descendants. In literature, this name typically designated either Nestor, the son of Neleus, or Antilochus, his grandson. One notable offshoot of this family line was the Alcmaeonidae.

== List ==
- Neleus
- Nestor
- Antilochus
