= Oxyntes =

Mythical king of Athens

Oxyntes (Ancient Greek: Ὀξύντης) was a mythical king of Athens, son of Demophon (and therefore grandson of Theseus). He had two sons, Apheidas and Thymoetes, who succeeded him, one another, in the throne. Thymoetes was the last descendant of Theseus on the Athenian throne., according to Eusebius, he reigned for 12 years, and it was during his reign that the Amazons burnt down the temple of Artemis at Ephesus

Regnal titles
Preceded by Demophon	King of Athens; 12 years	Succeeded by Apheidas
