= Melanthus =

Mythical King of Athens from 1126 to 1089 BC

In Greek mythology, Melanthus (Ancient Greek: Μέλανθος) was a king of Athens and son of Andropompus and Henioche.

== Mythology ==
Melanthus was among the descendants of Neleus (the Neleidae) expelled from Messenia, by the descendants of Heracles, as part of the legendary "Return of the Heracleidae", later associated with the supposed "Dorian invasion".

Melanthus fled to Athens, along with other of the expelled Neleidae, Alcmaeon and the sons of Paeon. There he helped king Thymoetes of Attica battle against Xanthos the Boeotian, who was waging war against Athens, by taking Thymoetes' place in an arranged duel between the two that would determine the outcome of the conflict.

As Melanthus approached Xanthos on the battlefield, he complained to his opponent that the duel was unfair, since there was a second man in a black goat skin (identified with Dionysus) behind him. As Xanthos turned his back to look at the supposed man that was with him, Melanthus struck Xanthos with his weapon, killing him and ending the war. He returned victorious to Athens and became its new king. Another version of events by Pausanias, states that it was Melanthus' father Andropompus who killed Xanthos. This event became the base upon which the festival of Apaturia was created.

Melanthus was later succeeded by Codrus, who was considered to be a forefather to the Greek philosopher Plato. According to Diogenes Laertius who cited Thrasylus as his source, Codrus and Melanthus also trace their descent from Poseidon.

Melanthus was also a shipmate of Acoetes who attempted to kidnap Dionysus.

Regnal titles
Preceded by Thymoetes	King of Athens; 37 years	Succeeded by Codrus
