= List of kings of Athens =

Before the Athenian democracy, the tyrants, and the Archons, the city-state of Athens was ruled by kings. Most of these are probably mythical or only semi-historical. The following lists contain the chronological order of the title King of Athens (also prescribed earlier as kings of Attica), a semi-mythological title.

== Earliest kings ==
These kings were supposed to have ruled in Attica before the flood of Deucalion.

King	Comments
Porphyrion	Founder of the sanctuary of Heavenly Aphrodite on Athmoneis, an Athenian deme
Colaenus	Erected a temple to Artemis Colænis
Mopsopus	Eponymous king of Mopsopia, an earlier name for Attica
Actaeus	Father of Agraulus, and father-in-law to Cecrops

== Erechtheid dynasty ==
The early Athenian tradition, followed by the 3rd century BC Parian Chronicle, made Cecrops, a mythical half-man half-serpent, the first king of Athens. The dates for the following kings were conjectured centuries later, by historians of the Hellenistic era who tried to backdate events by cross-referencing earlier sources such as the Parian Chronicle. Tradition says that King Menestheus took part in the Trojan War.

The following list follows that of 1st Century BC Castor of Rhodes (FGrHist 250), with Castor's dates given in modern terms.

Reign	King	Comments
1556–1506 BC	Cecrops I	Born from the Earth, he married Actaeus' daughter Agraulus and succeeded him to the throne
1506–1497 BC	Cranaus	Earth-born, deposed by Amphictyon son of Deucalion
1497–1487 BC	Amphictyon	Either son of Deucalion or Earth-born, he deposed Cranaus and was in turn deposed by Erichthonius
1487–1437 BC	Erichthonius	Earth-born son of Hephaestus and either Gaia, Athena or Atthis
1437–1397 BC	Pandion I	Son of Erichthonius
1397–1347 BC	Erechtheus	Son of Pandion I
1347–1307 BC	Cecrops II	Son of Erechtheus; omitted in Heraclides' epitome of Aristotle's Constitution of the Athenians
1307–1282 BC	Pandion II	Son of Cecrops II
1282–1234 BC	Aegeus	Son of Pandion II; construction of Trojan Walls by Poseidon, Apollo and the mortal Aeacus (c. 1282 BC)
1234–1205 BC	Theseus	Son of Aegeus
1205–1183 BC	Menestheus	Trojan War and the Sack of Troy (c. 1183 BC)
1183–1150 BC	Demophon	Son of Theseus
1150–1136 BC	Oxyntes	Son of Demophon
1136–1135 BC	Apheidas	Son of Oxyntes
1135–1127 BC	Thymoetes	Son of Oxyntes and brother of Apheidas

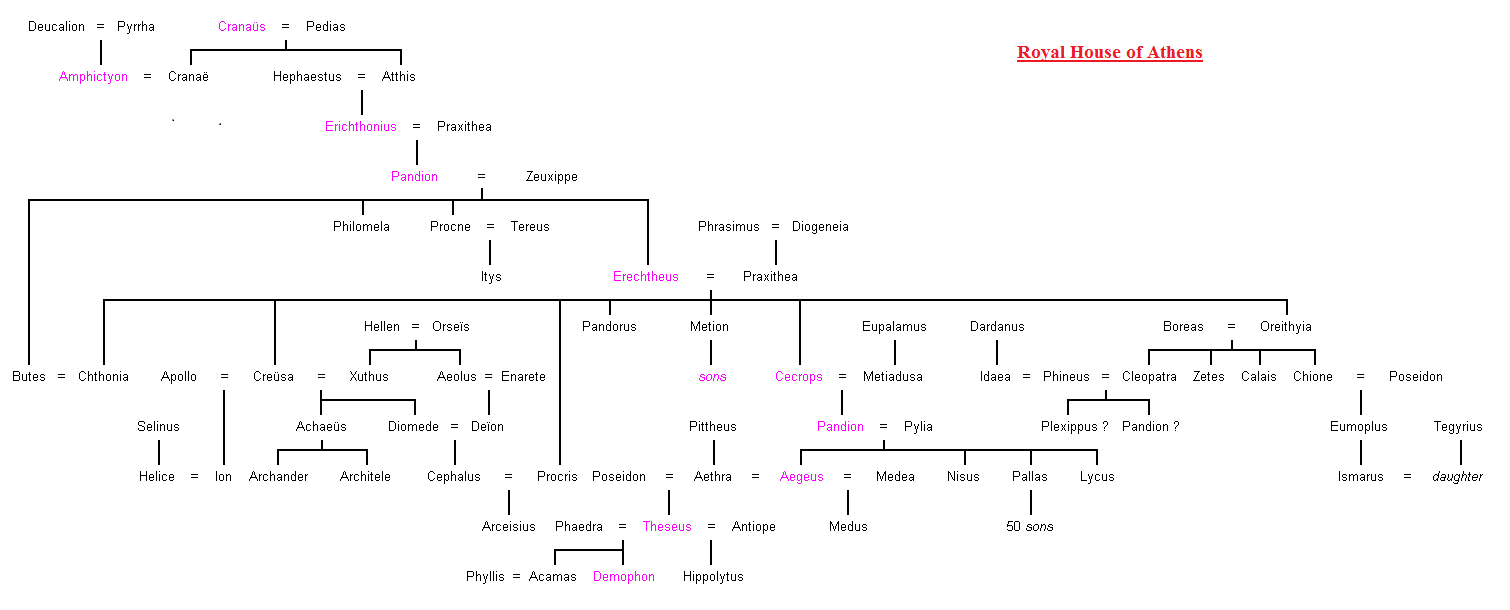
Mythological Royal House of Athens

== Melanthid dynasty ==
Melanthus was the Neleides king of Pylos in Messenia. Being driven out by the Dorian and Heraclidae invasion, he came to Athens where Thymoetes resigned the crown to him. Codrus, the last king, repelled the Dorian invasion of Attica.

Reign	King	Comments
1126–1089 BC	Melanthus
1089–1068 BC	Codrus

After Codrus's death, his sons Medon and Acastus either reigned as kings, or became hereditary archons. In 753 BC the hereditary archonship was replaced by a non-hereditary system (see Archons of Athens).
