= 130s =

Decade

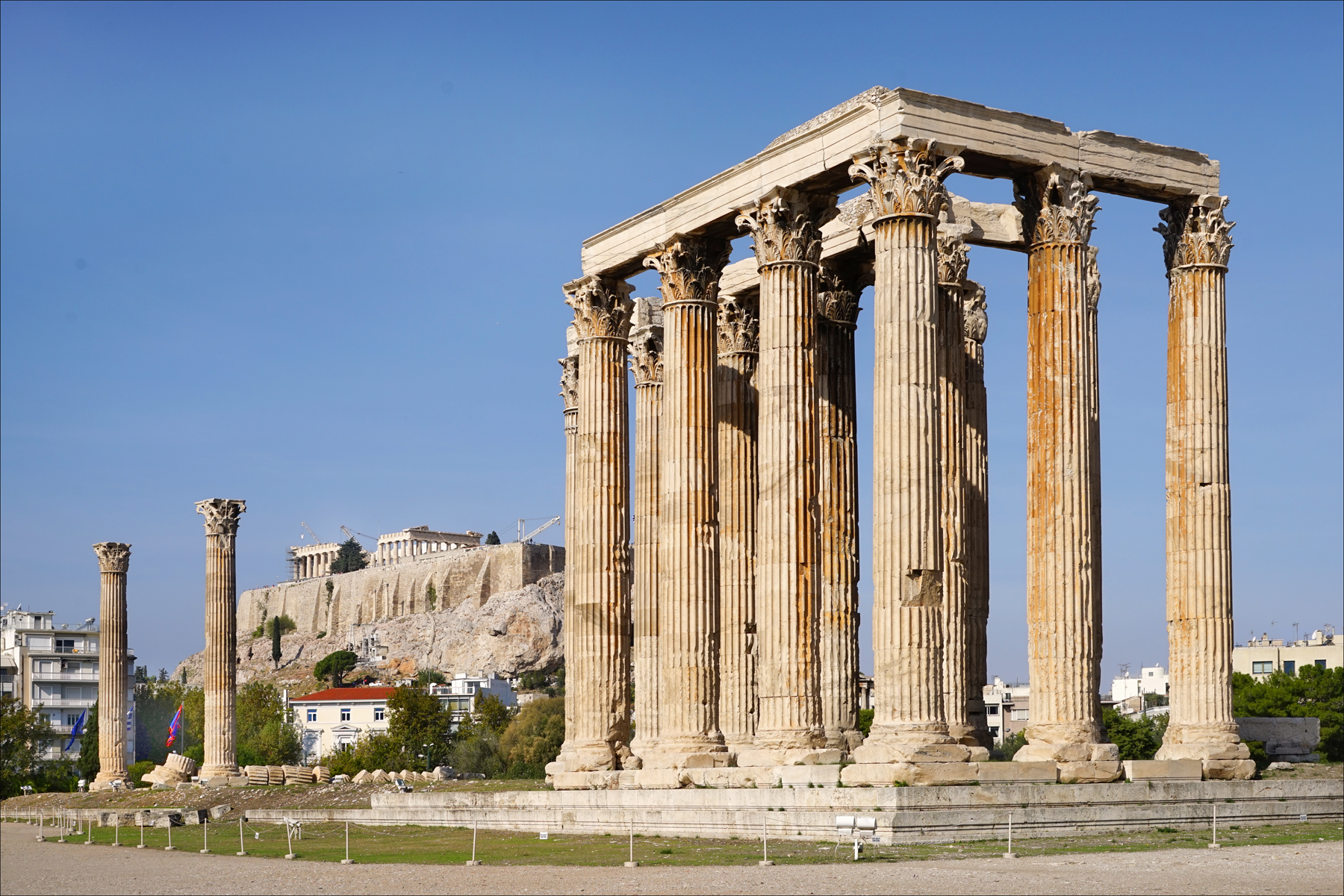
The Temple of Olympian Zeus (at the time the largest temple in Greece), completed in 131 after 638 years.

The 130s was a decade that ran from January 1, 130, to December 31, 139.

The Roman Empire was under the rule of Emperor Hadrian, and after 138, Antoninus Pius. During the middle of the decade, Jewish leader Simon bar Kokhba led a large-scale armed rebellion against the Romans in Judea, known as the Bar Kokhba Revolt. This was the last of the major Jewish–Roman wars. However, the revolt was quelled in 135 by the Romans and the rebels' Jewish state was destroyed. The Romans retook Jerusalem and named it Aelia Capitolina. The Romans also fought wars with the Alani and the Suebi tribes.

In 135, two major political changes occurred in Han China. Eunuch-marquesses began to be allowed to pass their marches to their adopted sons, and Liang Shang became the commander of the armed forces and effectively the most powerful individual in the imperial government. Neither of these developments appeared at the time to be major, but had great implications. The former demonstrated that the power of the eunuchs was becoming systemic, and the latter led to the start of the Liangs controlling the imperial government for several administrations. From 136 to 138, there were a number of native rebellions in various parts of southern China Jiaozhi. While these were generally put down with relative ease (in particular, the rebels generally surrendered willingly if the corrupt officials they were protesting against were replaced by Emperor Shun), these would foreshadow the much more serious rebellions that would come in the next few decades.

In Syria, the Temple of Baalshamin was built in Palmyra, which became rich after the city introduced tax laws for trade.

For science, Chinese astronomer and inventor Zhang Heng was also active during this period, inventing and presenting the first seismoscope in 132.

== Events ==
=== By place ===
==== Roman Empire ====
- A law is passed in Rome banning the execution of slaves without a trial.
- The Temple of Olympian Zeus is completed at Athens.
- Emperor Hadrian visits the cities Petra and Gerasa (Jerash).
- A Triumphal Arch for Hadrian is built in Gerasa.
- Construction begins on Canopus, Hadrian's Villa, Tivoli, Italy.

==== Asia ====
- Huviska becomes king of the Kushan Empire in India.
- The Scythian king Rudradaman I reconquers the lands annexed by Gautamiputra from the Andhra.

=== By topic ===
==== Arts and sciences ====
- Claudius Ptolemaeus tabulates angles of refraction for several media.
- The Antinous Mondragone is sculpted.
- c. 130–138 – Hadrian Hunting Boar and Sacrificing to Apollo, sculptural reliefs on the Arch of Constantine, Rome, are made.
- c. 130–138 – Antinous, from Hadrian's Villa at Tivoli, Italy, is made. It is now kept at Museo Gregoriano Egizio, Rome.

=== By place ===
==== Roman Empire ====
- Emperor Hadrian builds the city Aelia Capitolina, on the location of Jerusalem.
- The Praetor's Edict is definitively codified by Salvius Julianus, on Hadrian's orders. This change means that senatorial decrees become a mere confirmation of the imperial speech (oratio principis) which initiated them.
- Reorganization of the Imperial Council: Central administration is reinforced, and administrative positions are entrusted to knights, according to a very strict hierarchy. Under the reorganization, the Roman Senate is excluded from controlling the business of state.
- Hadrian restores the monarchist policy of Claudius and Domitian. The equestrian order is given full legal status, and attains the second order of the state.
- Italy is divided into legal districts managed by consuls, a direct blow to the power and prestige of the Senate.

=== By topic ===
==== Religion ====
- The Edict of Hadrian prohibits the practice of circumcision. Additionally, Hadrian prohibits public reading of the Torah under penalty of death, as well as observance of festivals and the Sabbath, the teaching of Judaic Law, and the ordination of rabbis.
- The Temple of Baalshamin is built in Palmyra.

=== By place ===
==== Roman Empire ====
- The Temple of Olympian Zeus (Athens) is completed, using Cossutius' design.
- Bar Kokhba Revolt: The messianic, charismatic Jewish leader Simon bar Kokhba starts a war of liberation for Judea against the Romans, which is eventually crushed (in 135) by Emperor Hadrian; Rabbi Akiva is supportive of the rebellion.
- Legio X Fretensis must evacuate Jerusalem, returning to Caesarea. The Jews enter the city, and re-establish their system of sacrifices. They strike coins to celebrate their independence, which will last for only 30 months. Legio XXII Deiotariana, which advanced from Egypt, is completely destroyed.
- Merchants in Britain build structures outside the forts of Hadrian's Wall, and offer goods and services (including brothels) to Roman soldiers, who receive salaries in a region that otherwise has virtually no ready money.
- Construction begins on the Mausoleum of Hadrian in Rome (known today as Castel Sant'Angelo).

==== Asia ====
- Change of era name from Yongjian (7th year) to Yangjia of the Chinese Han dynasty.

=== By topic ===
==== Art and Science ====
- Chinese scientist Zhang Heng invents the first seismometer for determining the exact cardinal direction of earthquakes hundreds of miles away; the device employs a series of complex gears around a central swinging pendulum.

=== By place ===
==== Roman Empire ====
- Bar Kokhba Revolt: Sextus Julius Severus, Roman governor of Britain, is sent to Judea (in 136 renamed Syria Palaestina) to quell the revolt. Jewish rebels, led by Simon bar Kokhba and Eleazar, cut off the vital supply lines and Roman garrisons in Palestine. Despite Roman reinforcements from Syria and Egypt, they establish an independent state in Judea.

=== By place ===
==== Roman Empire ====
- A law improving the lot of free workers is passed in Rome.
- Arrianus, Roman governor of Cappadocia, repulses an attack of the Alani, a nomadic tribe from southeastern Russia.
- Summer – Sextus Julius Severus, Roman governor of Judea, begins a campaign against the Jewish rebel strongholds in the mountains.
- The Romans retake Jerusalem. The largely-destroyed city is renamed Aelia Capitolina.

==== Asia ====
- Ilseong becomes ruler of the Korean kingdom of Silla.

=== By topic ===
==== Architecture ====
- Hadrian's Villa in Tivoli, Italy, is completed.

=== By place ===
==== Roman Empire ====
- A Jewish diaspora begins, as Emperor Hadrian bars Jews from Jerusalem, and has survivors of the massacre dispersed across the Roman Empire. Many join Mediterranean ports.
- Jerusalem is renamed Colonia Aelia Capitolina, in honor of Hadrian. Legio VI Ferrata rebuilds the legionary fortress in the city, and constructs a Roman temple at Golgotha.
- An altar to Jupiter is erected, on the site of the Temple in Jerusalem.
- Canopus, Hadrian's Villa, Tivoli, Italy, is finished.
- Alans threaten Cappadocia; they are repulsed by Arrian.

==== Asia ====
- Last (4th) year of Yangjia era of the Chinese Han Dynasty.

=== By topic ===
==== Religion ====
- Marcus (or Mahalia) becomes bishop of Jerusalem (d. 156)

=== By place ===
==== Roman Empire ====
- The war against the Suebi begins.
- Following the Bar Kokhba Revolt, Emperor Hadrian expels the Jews from Judea, and receives a triumphal arch near Scythopolis. The Roman province of Iudaea (plus Galilee) becomes Syria Palaestina (the name Palestine as a designation for this land has been used since at least the 5th century BC (mentioned by Herodotus)).
- Hadrian dictates his memoirs at his villa near Tivoli (Tibur) outside Rome.
- Hadrian uncovers a new conspiracy among certain senators. He adopts Lucius Aelius as his heir.

==== Asia ====
- First year of Yonghe era of the Chinese Han dynasty.

=== By topic ===
==== Religion ====
- Pope Hyginus succeeds Pope Telesphorus as the ninth pope of Rome according to tradition.
- Change of Bishop of Byzantium from Bishop Eleutherius to Bishop Felix.

=== By place ===
==== Roman Empire ====
- Tax laws are passed for trade in Palmyra. The caravan city grows rich by importing rare products from the Persian Gulf, and by exporting items manufactured by the Mediterranean world to the East.

==== Asia ====
- In Jiaozhi (present-day northern Vietnam) during the Second Era of Northern Domination, a rebellion of the Cham people broke out and lasted for one year, until the peace agreement was made between the Han dynasty governors and the rebels in 138.

=== By place ===
==== Roman Empire ====
- February 25 – Emperor Hadrian makes Antoninus Pius his successor, on condition that he adopt Marcus Aurelius and Lucius Verus.
- July 10 – Hadrian dies after a heart failure at Baiae, and is buried at Rome in the Gardens of Domitia beside his wife, Vibia Sabina.
- Antoninus Pius succeeds Hadrian as Roman Emperor, and asks the Senate to confer divine honors for Hadrian.
- Construction begins on the Theater of Philadelphia (Amman).
- Hadrian's Villa, Tivoli, Italy, is finished.

==== Asia ====
- In Jiaozhi (present-day northern Vietnam), during the Second Era of Northern Domination, a peace agreement was made between the Han governor and the Cham rebels following their uprising in 137. Historical records do not clarify the terms of the agreement.

=== By topic ===
==== Commerce ====
- The silver content of the Roman denarius falls to 75 percent under Emperor Antoninus Pius, down from 87 percent under Hadrian.

=== By place ===
==== Roman Empire ====
- The Tomb of Hadrian in Rome is completed; Emperor Antoninus Pius cremates the body of Hadrian, and places his ashes, together with that of his wife Vibia Sabina and his adopted son, Lucius Aelius, in the mausoleum.
- Marcus Aurelius is named Caesar. He marries the 9-year-old Faustina the Younger, daughter of Antoninus Pius.
- Antoninus Pius and Gaius Bruttius Praesens become Roman Consuls.

== Significant people ==
- Hadrian, Roman Emperor

== Births ==
130

- December 15 – Lucius Verus, Roman emperor (d. 169)
- Avidius Cassius, Roman general and usurper (d. 175)
- Faustina the Younger, Roman empress
- Irenaeus, Greek bishop and saint (d. 202)

132

- Cai Yong, Chinese calligrapher and musician (d. 192)
- Han Huandi, emperor of the Han dynasty (d. 168)
- Tao Qian, Chinese official and warlord (d. 194)

133

- January 30 – Didius Julianus, Roman emperor (according to Cassius Dio) (d. 193)
- Athenagoras of Athens, Greek Christian apologist (d. 190)

134

- Dong Zhuo, Chinese general and warlord (d. 192)
- Marcus Macrinius Avitus Catonius Vindex, Roman politician (d. 176)

135

- Judah ha-Nasi, Talmudic scholar (according to Jewish tradition, he was born the same day Rabbi Akiva died a martyr's death) (d. 217)
- Sanabares, Indo-Parthian king (d. 160)

137

- Didius Julianus, Roman emperor (according to Historia Augusta) (d. 193)
- Shi Xie, Chinese official, ruler of Jiaozhi (d. 226)
- Wang Yun, Chinese official, politician (d. 192)

138

- Han Zhidi, Chinese emperor of the Han dynasty (d. 146)
- Marcus Ummidius Quadratus, Roman politician (d. 182)

== Deaths ==
130

- October 30 – Antinous, lover of Hadrian (b. 111)
- Carpocrates, religious philosopher
- Juvenal, Roman poet and satirist
- Marinus of Tyre, Greek cartographer
- Publius Juventius Celsus, Roman jurist (b. AD 67)
- Emperor Keikō of Japan, according to legend.

131

- Joshua ben Hananiah, leading Jewish tanna

132

- Juvenal of Benevento, Roman Christian and saint
- Sun Cheng, Chinese eunuch and politician

133

- Cyriacus, bishop of Jerusalem (approximate date)

134

- Jima of Silla (or Jima Isageum), Korean ruler of Silla

135

- Epictetus, Greek Stoic philosopher (b. AD 50)
- Rabbi Akiva, Jewish scholar and sage (b. AD 50)
- Rabbi Ishmael, Jewish scholar and lawmaker
- Simon bar Kokhba, Jewish military leader

136

- May 24 – Judah ben Dama, one of the Ten Martyrs
- Gajabahu I, king of Raja Rata (modern Sri Lanka)
- Lucius Julius Servianus, Roman politician (b. AD 45)

137

- Telesphorus of Rome

138

- January 1 – Lucius Aelius Caesar, Roman politician and adopted son of Hadrian (b. 101)
- July 10 – Hadrian, Roman emperor died at Baie (b. AD 76)
- Zenobius, Greek sophist and writer (b. 117)

139

- Zhang Heng, Chinese astronomer and statesman (b. AD 78)
