= AD 136 =

136 in various calendars
- Gregorian calendar: 136; CXXXVI
- Ab urbe condita: 889
- Assyrian calendar: 4886
- Balinese saka calendar: 57–58
- Bengali calendar: −458 – −457
- Berber calendar: 1086
- Buddhist calendar: 680
- Burmese calendar: −502
- Byzantine calendar: 5644–5645
- Chinese calendar: 乙亥年 (Wood Pig); 2833 or 2626 — to — 丙子年 (Fire Rat); 2834 or 2627
- Coptic calendar: −148 – −147
- Discordian calendar: 1302
- Ethiopian calendar: 128–129
- Hebrew calendar: 3896–3897
- Hindu calendars
- Vikram Samvat: 192–193
- Shaka Samvat: 57–58
- Kali Yuga: 3236–3237
- Holocene calendar: 10136
- Iranian calendar: 486 BP – 485 BP
- Islamic calendar: 501 BH – 500 BH
- Javanese calendar: 11–12
- Julian calendar: 136; CXXXVI
- Korean calendar: 2469
- Minguo calendar: 1776 before ROC 民前1776年
- Nanakshahi calendar: −1332
- Seleucid era: 447/448 AG
- Thai solar calendar: 678–679
- Tibetan calendar: ཤིང་མོ་ཕག་ལོ་ (female Wood-Boar); 262 or −119 or −891 — to — མེ་ཕོ་བྱི་བ་ལོ་ (male Fire-Rat); 263 or −118 or −890

Year 136 (CXXXVI) was a leap year starting on Saturday of the Julian calendar, the 136th Year of the Common Era (CE) and Anno Domini (AD) designations, the 136th year of the 1st millennium, the 36th year of the 2nd century, and the 7th year of the 130s decade. At the time, it was known as the Year of the Consulship of Commodus and Civica (or, less frequently, year 889 Ab urbe condita). The denomination 136 for this year has been used since the early medieval period, when the Anno Domini calendar era became the prevalent method in Europe for naming years.

== Events ==
=== By place ===
==== Roman Empire ====
- The war against the Suebi begins.
- Following the Bar Kokhba Revolt, Emperor Hadrian expels the Jews from Judea, and receives a triumphal arch near Scythopolis. The Roman province of Iudaea (plus Galilee) becomes Syria Palaestina (the name Palestine as a designation for this land has been used since at least the 5th century BC (mentioned by Herodotus)).
- Hadrian dictates his memoirs at his villa near Tivoli (Tibur) outside Rome.
- Hadrian uncovers a new conspiracy among certain senators. He adopts Lucius Aelius as his heir.

==== Asia ====
- First year of Yonghe era of the Chinese Han dynasty.

=== By topic ===
==== Religion ====
- Pope Hyginus succeeds Pope Telesphorus as the ninth pope of Rome according to tradition.
- Change of Bishop of Byzantium from Bishop Eleutherius to Bishop Felix.

== Deaths ==
- May 24 – Judah ben Dama, one of the Ten Martyrs
- Gajabahu I, king of Raja Rata (modern Sri Lanka)
- Lucius Julius Servianus, Roman politician (b. AD 45)
