= AD 139 =

139 in various calendars
- Gregorian calendar: 139; CXXXIX
- Ab urbe condita: 892
- Assyrian calendar: 4889
- Balinese saka calendar: 60–61
- Bengali calendar: −455 – −454
- Berber calendar: 1089
- Buddhist calendar: 683
- Burmese calendar: −499
- Byzantine calendar: 5647–5648
- Chinese calendar: 戊寅年 (Earth Tiger); 2836 or 2629 — to — 己卯年 (Earth Rabbit); 2837 or 2630
- Coptic calendar: −145 – −144
- Discordian calendar: 1305
- Ethiopian calendar: 131–132
- Hebrew calendar: 3899–3900
- Hindu calendars
- Vikram Samvat: 195–196
- Shaka Samvat: 60–61
- Kali Yuga: 3239–3240
- Holocene calendar: 10139
- Iranian calendar: 483 BP – 482 BP
- Islamic calendar: 498 BH – 497 BH
- Javanese calendar: 14–15
- Julian calendar: 139; CXXXIX
- Korean calendar: 2472
- Minguo calendar: 1773 before ROC 民前1773年
- Nanakshahi calendar: −1329
- Seleucid era: 450/451 AG
- Thai solar calendar: 681–682
- Tibetan calendar: ས་ཕོ་སྟག་ལོ་ (male Earth-Tiger); 265 or −116 or −888 — to — ས་མོ་ཡོས་ལོ་ (female Earth-Hare); 266 or −115 or −887

Year 139 (CXXXIX) was a common year starting on Wednesday of the Julian calendar. At the time, in Western civilization, it was known as the Year of the Consulship of Hadrianus and Praesens (or, less frequently, year 892 Ab urbe condita). The denomination 139 for this year has been used since the early medieval period, when the Anno Domini calendar era became the prevalent method in Europe for naming years.

== Events ==
=== By place ===
==== Roman Empire ====
- The Tomb of Hadrian in Rome is completed; Emperor Antoninus Pius cremates the body of Hadrian, and places his ashes, together with that of his wife Vibia Sabina and his adopted son, Lucius Aelius, in the mausoleum.
- Marcus Aurelius is named Caesar. He marries the 9-year-old Faustina the Younger, daughter of Antoninus Pius.
- Antoninus Pius and Gaius Bruttius Praesens become Roman Consuls.

==== Armenia ====
- 139 Mcurn earthquake, listed in bibliographical records of seismology as having affected the city of Mcurn (modern Hösnek, Turkey). The earthquake reportedly took place in the vicinity of Mount Ararat. The region was part of the historic Kingdom of Armenia, corresponding to eastern areas of modern Turkey. A primary source for the earthquake is the work of the historian Movses Khorenatsi (5th century).

== Deaths ==
- Zhang Heng, Chinese astronomer and statesman (b. AD 78)

== Sources ==
- Guidoboni, Emanuela; Traina, Giusto (1995), A new catalogue of earthquakes in the historical Armenian area from antiquity to the 12th century, Annals of Geophysics
