= 31 BC =

31 BC in various calendars
- Gregorian calendar: 31 BC; XXXI BC
- Ab urbe condita: 723
- Ancient Egypt era: XXXIII dynasty, 293
- Pharaoh: Cleopatra VII, 21
- Ancient Greek Olympiad (summer): 187th Olympiad, year 2
- Assyrian calendar: 4720
- Balinese saka calendar: N/A
- Bengali calendar: −624 – −623
- Berber calendar: 920
- Buddhist calendar: 514
- Burmese calendar: −668
- Byzantine calendar: 5478–5479
- Chinese calendar: 己丑年 (Earth Ox); 2667 or 2460 — to — 庚寅年 (Metal Tiger); 2668 or 2461
- Coptic calendar: −314 – −313
- Discordian calendar: 1136
- Ethiopian calendar: −38 – −37
- Hebrew calendar: 3730–3731
- Hindu calendars
- Vikram Samvat: 26–27
- Shaka Samvat: N/A
- Kali Yuga: 3070–3071
- Holocene calendar: 9970
- Iranian calendar: 652 BP – 651 BP
- Islamic calendar: 672 BH – 671 BH
- Javanese calendar: N/A
- Julian calendar: 31 BC; XXXI BC
- Korean calendar: 2303
- Minguo calendar: 1942 before ROC 民前1942年
- Nanakshahi calendar: −1498
- Seleucid era: 281/282 AG
- Thai solar calendar: 512–513
- Tibetan calendar: ས་མོ་གླང་ལོ་ (female Earth-Ox); 96 or −285 or −1057 — to — ལྕགས་ཕོ་སྟག་ལོ་ (male Iron-Tiger); 97 or −284 or −1056

The Battle of Actium

Year 31 BC was either a common year starting on Tuesday, Wednesday or Thursday or a leap year starting on Tuesday or Wednesday of the Julian calendar (the sources differ, see leap year error for further information) and a common year starting on Tuesday of the Proleptic Julian calendar. At the time, it was known as the Year of the Consulship of Antonius and Caesar or as Caesar and Messalla (or, less frequently, year 723 Ab urbe condita). The denomination 31 BC for this year has been used since the early medieval period, when the Anno Domini calendar era became the prevalent method in Europe for naming years.

== Events ==
=== By place ===
==== Roman Republic ====
- Augustus, then known as Imperator Caesar, becomes Roman Consul for the third time. Antony was designated as his colleague but is deposed from office, an action that Antony does not recognise. Elected in Antony's place is Marcus Valerius Messalla Corvinus; Antony's consulship is not recorded in some sources, as Valerius is marked instead as consul ordinarius.
- Octavian crosses the Strait of Otranto and lands with an army (15 legions) at Panormus in Dalmatia. He marches to Toryne in the south, and establishes a bridgehead at the Gulf of Ambracia.
- Marcus Vipsanius Agrippa sails with 300 war galleys to the western Peloponnese, and occupies strategic positions around the Gulf of Corinth to cut off Antony's line of communication.
- Antony, alerted by Octavian's presence, sets up camp on the southern shore, at the promontory of Actium. He dispatches a force to isolate the camp of Octavian in the valley of Louros.
- Agrippa storms Leucas, giving Octavian an anchorage and a second depot for his land supplies. He seizes the garrison at Patrae, and takes Antony's headquarters.
- Amyntas, king of Galatia, deserts with 2,000 cavalry to Octavian. One-third of Antony's oarsmen are lost to malnutrition, disease and desertion.
- September 2 – Roman Civil War: Battle of Actium: Off the western coast of Greece, Octavian Caesar defeats naval forces under Mark Antony and Cleopatra VII.
- The Egyptian fleet (60 warships), including Cleopatra's treasure ship, retreats to Taenarus. Antony transfers his flag to a smaller vessel and breaks through Octavian's line.
- Winter – Octavian (32 years old) takes court at Samos. After his decisive victory at Actium he builds Nicopolis; the city is populated by Greeks from settlements further inland.

==== Roman Palestine ====
- In the Judean Desert on an isolated rock plateau, fortress Masada is completed. Herod the Great builds an armory, barracks, storehouses and a palace.
- 31 BC Judea earthquake, earthquake mentioned in catalogues of historical earthquakes. It affected the Herodian Kingdom of Judea in the Holy Land.

=== By topic ===
==== Art ====
- The Hellenistic period ends (or AD 14 by some scholars).

== Births ==
- Aristobulus IV, Jewish prince of Judea (d. 7 BC)
- Tiruvalluvar, Indian poet and philosopher

== Deaths ==
- Gnaeus Domitius Ahenobarbus, Roman general and politician
- Tarcondimotus I, Roman client king of Cilicia
- Hu Hanxie, chanyu of Xiongnu.
