= AD 141 =

141 in various calendars
- Gregorian calendar: 141; CXLI
- Ab urbe condita: 894
- Assyrian calendar: 4891
- Balinese saka calendar: 62–63
- Bengali calendar: −453 – −452
- Berber calendar: 1091
- Buddhist calendar: 685
- Burmese calendar: −497
- Byzantine calendar: 5649–5650
- Chinese calendar: 庚辰年 (Metal Dragon); 2838 or 2631 — to — 辛巳年 (Metal Snake); 2839 or 2632
- Coptic calendar: −143 – −142
- Discordian calendar: 1307
- Ethiopian calendar: 133–134
- Hebrew calendar: 3901–3902
- Hindu calendars
- Vikram Samvat: 197–198
- Shaka Samvat: 62–63
- Kali Yuga: 3241–3242
- Holocene calendar: 10141
- Iranian calendar: 481 BP – 480 BP
- Islamic calendar: 496 BH – 495 BH
- Javanese calendar: 16–17
- Julian calendar: 141; CXLI
- Korean calendar: 2474
- Minguo calendar: 1771 before ROC 民前1771年
- Nanakshahi calendar: −1327
- Seleucid era: 452/453 AG
- Thai solar calendar: 683–684
- Tibetan calendar: ལྕགས་ཕོ་འབྲུག་ལོ་ (male Iron-Dragon); 267 or −114 or −886 — to — ལྕགས་མོ་སྦྲུལ་ལོ་ (female Iron-Snake); 268 or −113 or −885

Year 141 (CXLI) was a common year starting on Saturday of the Julian calendar. At the time, it was known as the Year of the Consulship of Severus and Stloga (or, less frequently, year 894 Ab urbe condita). The denomination 141 for this year has been used since the early medieval period, when the Anno Domini calendar era became the prevalent method in Europe for naming years.

== Events ==
=== By place ===
==== Roman Empire ====
- The Temple of Antoninus and Faustina is constructed in Rome; the temple is dedicated to Empress Faustina the Elder.

==== Asia ====
- Last (6th) year of Yonghe era of the Chinese Han dynasty.
- The 141 Lycia earthquake affects most of the Roman provinces of Lycia and Caria and the islands of Rhodes, Kos, Simi and Serifos. It triggers a severe tsunami, which causes major inundation.

=== By topic ===
==== Religion ====
- Change of Patriarch of Constantinople from Felix of Byzantium to Polycarpus II of Byzantium.

==== Arts and Science ====
- 6th recorded perihelion passage of Halley's Comet.

== Births ==
- Cheng Yu, Chinese politician and court advisor (d. 220)
- Ummidia Cornificia Faustina, Roman noblewoman (d. 182)

== Deaths ==
- Faustina the Elder, Roman empress (b. c. AD 100)
- Philo of Byblos, Phoenician historical writer (b. AD 64)
