= AD 134 =

134 in various calendars
- Gregorian calendar: 134; CXXXIV
- Ab urbe condita: 887
- Assyrian calendar: 4884
- Balinese saka calendar: 55–56
- Bengali calendar: −460 – −459
- Berber calendar: 1084
- Buddhist calendar: 678
- Burmese calendar: −504
- Byzantine calendar: 5642–5643
- Chinese calendar: 癸酉年 (Water Rooster); 2831 or 2624 — to — 甲戌年 (Wood Dog); 2832 or 2625
- Coptic calendar: −150 – −149
- Discordian calendar: 1300
- Ethiopian calendar: 126–127
- Hebrew calendar: 3894–3895
- Hindu calendars
- Vikram Samvat: 190–191
- Shaka Samvat: 55–56
- Kali Yuga: 3234–3235
- Holocene calendar: 10134
- Iranian calendar: 488 BP – 487 BP
- Islamic calendar: 503 BH – 502 BH
- Javanese calendar: 9–10
- Julian calendar: 134; CXXXIV
- Korean calendar: 2467
- Minguo calendar: 1778 before ROC 民前1778年
- Nanakshahi calendar: −1334
- Seleucid era: 445/446 AG
- Thai solar calendar: 676–677
- Tibetan calendar: ཆུ་མོ་བྱ་ལོ་ (female Water-Bird); 260 or −121 or −893 — to — ཤིང་ཕོ་ཁྱི་ལོ་ (male Wood-Dog); 261 or −120 or −892

Year 134 (CXXXIV) was a common year starting on Thursday of the Julian calendar. At the time, it was known as the Year of the Consulship of Ursus and Varus (or, less frequently, year 887 Ab urbe condita). The denomination 134 for this year has been used since the early medieval period, when the Anno Domini calendar era became the prevalent method in Europe for naming years.

== Events ==
=== By place ===
==== Roman Empire ====
- A law improving the lot of free workers is passed in Rome.
- Arrianus, Roman governor of Cappadocia, repulses an attack of the Alani, a nomadic tribe from southeastern Russia.
- Summer – Sextus Julius Severus, Roman governor of Judea, begins a campaign against the Jewish rebel strongholds in the mountains.
- The Romans retake Jerusalem. The largely-destroyed city is renamed Aelia Capitolina.

==== Asia ====
- Ilseong becomes ruler of the Korean kingdom of Silla.

=== By topic ===
==== Architecture ====
- Hadrian's Villa in Tivoli, Italy, is completed.

== Births ==
- Dong Zhuo, Chinese general and warlord (d. 192)
- Marcus Macrinius Avitus Catonius Vindex, Roman politician (d. 176)

== Deaths ==
- Jima of Silla (or Jima Isageum), Korean ruler of Silla
