= 1469 =

1469 in various calendars
- Gregorian calendar: 1469; MCDLXIX
- Ab urbe condita: 2222
- Armenian calendar: 918; ԹՎ ՋԺԸ
- Assyrian calendar: 6219
- Balinese saka calendar: 1390–1391
- Bengali calendar: 875–876
- Berber calendar: 2419
- English Regnal year: 8 Edw. 4 – 9 Edw. 4
- Buddhist calendar: 2013
- Burmese calendar: 831
- Byzantine calendar: 6977–6978
- Chinese calendar: 戊子年 (Earth Rat); 4166 or 3959 — to — 己丑年 (Earth Ox); 4167 or 3960
- Coptic calendar: 1185–1186
- Discordian calendar: 2635
- Ethiopian calendar: 1461–1462
- Hebrew calendar: 5229–5230
- Hindu calendars
- Vikram Samvat: 1525–1526
- Shaka Samvat: 1390–1391
- Kali Yuga: 4569–4570
- Holocene calendar: 11469
- Igbo calendar: 469–470
- Iranian calendar: 847–848
- Islamic calendar: 873–874
- Japanese calendar: Ōnin 3 / Bunmei 1 (文明元年)
- Javanese calendar: 1385–1386
- Julian calendar: 1469; MCDLXIX
- Korean calendar: 3802
- Minguo calendar: 443 before ROC 民前443年
- Nanakshahi calendar: 1
- Thai solar calendar: 2011–2012
- Tibetan calendar: ས་ཕོ་བྱི་བ་ལོ་ (male Earth-Rat); 1595 or 1214 or 442 — to — ས་མོ་གླང་ལོ་ (female Earth-Ox); 1596 or 1215 or 443

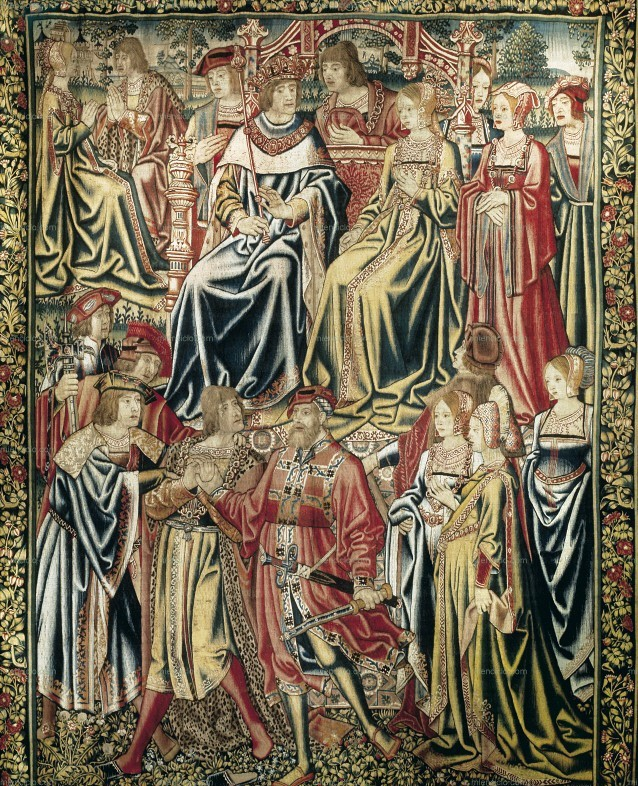
October 19: The eventual creation of the Kingdom of Spain is set by the wedding in Valladolid of Ferdinand and Isabella, the respective heirs to the thrones of the Crown of Aragon and the Crown of Castile.

Year 1469 (MCDLXIX) was a common year starting on Sunday of the Julian calendar.

== Events ==
=== January–March ===
- January 1 – Pope Paul II issues a papal bull establishing the military order of the Knights of Saint George at the request of Frederick III, Holy Roman Emperor, and invests Johann Siebenhirter as the order's first Grand Master.
- February 4 –
  - (22 Rajab 873 AH) At the Battle of Qarabagh, in what is now Azerbaijan, troops led by Uzun Hasan, ruler of Aq Qoyunlu, decisively defeat the Timurids of Samrkand, ruled by Abu Sa'id Mirza. Mirza is taken a prisoner of war and is executed four days later on February 8.
  - Han Myŏnghoe is appointed by King Yejong of Korea as the new Chief State Councillor, replacing Pak Wŏnhyŏng.
- March 24 – With Abu Sa'id Mirza having been killed at the battle of Qarabagh, the Timurid prince, Sultan Husayn Bayqara captures Herat (now in Afghanistan), the capital of the Timurid Empire, and proclaims himself the Emperor.

=== April–June ===
- April 23 – Cardinal Jean Balue, a close adviser of King Louis XI, is arrested for conspiring with Charles the Bold, Duke of Burgundy, and is charged with treason. Since there is a dispute over whether a Roman Catholic cleric can be tried by the royal court rather than an eccleastical court, Balue is spared the death penalty but spends the next 11 years in prison.
- May 3 – At Olomouc, Hungarian King Matyáš Korvín is elected by the Czech Catholic estates to be the King of Bohemia and his rule is accepted by the occupied regions of Moravia, Silesia and Lusatia, though the other Bohemian estates remain loyal to the Bohemian King Jiří z Poděbrad.
- June 3 – King Henry IV of Castile makes a gift of Gibraltar to Enrique de Guzmán, 2nd Duke of Medina Sidonia, as a reward for Guzman's work in capturing Gibraltar from the Moors.

=== July–September ===
- July 14 – The Holy Roman Emperor Frederick III issues a decree nullifying the 1466 Treaty of Soldin between Brandenburg and Pomerania.
- July 24 – The royalist Yorkists are defeated by rebels at the Battle of Edgcote in Northamptonshire, and King Edward IV is taken prisoner. Rebel leader Richard Neville, 16th Earl of Warwick, temporarily holds power to rule England but in September, Edward IV is freed and returns to the throne.
- August 1 – The Order of Saint Michael ( Ordre de Saint-Michel) is founded by King Louis XI of France as a response to the Duchy of Burgundy's Order of the Golden Fleece.
- September 27 – Hong Yunsŏng becomes the new head of government of the Kingdom of Korea as the new Chief State Councillor for King Yejong, replacing Han Myŏnghoe.

=== October–December ===
- October 13 – King Edward IV returns to London after having been imprisoned since July since being captured at the Battle of Edgcote.
- October 19 – Ferdinand II of Aragon marries Isabella I of Castile in Valladolid, bringing about a dynastic union.
- November 9 – King Louis XI, having taken back the Duchy of Normandy from the control of his inept younger brother, Charles of Valois, Duke of Berry, pledges at Rouen that the Duchy will never be ceded again. In a ceremony before the Exchequer of Normandy, the Duchy's administrative court, King Louis places the ducal ring (symbolic of the office as a ring worn by the Duke) upon an anvil and the ring is smashed.
- November 27 – King James III gives royal assent to numerous acts passed by the Parliament of Scotland.
- December 9 – Lorenzo de' Medici becomes the Lord of Florence, the de facto executive of the Florentine Republic in Italy, upon the death of his father, Piero di Cosimo de' Medici.

=== Date unknown ===
- Sigismund of Austria sells Upper Alsace to Charles the Bold, in exchange for aid in a war against the Swiss.
- Moctezuma I, Aztec ruler of Tenochtitlan, dies and is succeeded by Axayacatl.
- Anglo-Hanseatic War breaks out.
- Marsilio Ficino completes his translation of the collected works of Plato, writes Commentary on Plato's Symposium on Love, and starts to work on Platonic Theology.

== Births ==
- February 13 – Elia Levita, Renaissance Hebrew grammarian (d. 1549)
- February 20 – Thomas Cajetan, Italian philosopher (d. 1534)
- March 20 – Cecily of York, English princess (d. 1507)
- November 29 – Guru Nanak, Sikh guru (d. 1539)
- April 29 – William II, Landgrave of Hesse (d. 1509)
- May 3 – Niccolò Machiavelli, Italian historian and political author (d. 1527)
- May 31 – King Manuel I of Portugal (d. 1521)
- June 20 – Gian Galeazzo Sforza, Duke of Milan (d. 1494)
- August 4 – Margaret of Saxony, Duchess of Brunswick-Lüneburg (d. 1528)
- August 26 – King Ferdinand II of Naples (d. 1496)
- date unknown
  - John III of Navarre (d. 1516)
  - Silvio Passerini, Italian politician (d. 1529)
  - Laura Cereta, Italian humanist and feminist (d. 1499)
- probable – Vasco da Gama, Portuguese explorer (d. 1524)

== Deaths ==
- May 30 – Lope de Barrientos, powerful Castilian bishop and statesman (b. 1382)
- August 12 – Richard Woodville, 1st Earl Rivers (executed) (b. 1405)
- September 25 – Margaret of Brittany, Breton duchess consort (b. 1443)
- October 8/10 – Filippo Lippi, Italian artist (b. 1406)
- December 2 – Piero di Cosimo de' Medici, ruler of Florence (b. 1416)
- December 31 – King Yejong of Joseon (b. 1450)
- date unknown
  - Abu Sa'id Mirza, ruler of Persia and Afghanistan (b. 1424)
  - Niccolò Da Conti, Italian merchant and explorer (b. 1395)
  - Andrew Gray, 1st Lord Gray (b. c. 1390)
  - Moctezuma I, Aztec ruler of Tenochtitlan, son of Huitzilihuitl (b. 1390)
