= Tiger (zodiac) =

Sign of the Chinese zodiac

- "Tiger" in regular Chinese characters
- Chinese: 虎
Transcriptions
Standard Mandarin
- Hanyu Pinyin: hǔ
- Wade–Giles: hu^{3}
- IPA: [xù]
Hakka
- Romanization: fú
Yue: Cantonese
- Yale Romanization: fú
- Jyutping: fu2
- IPA: [fu˧˥]
Southern Min
- Hokkien POJ: hó͘
Eastern Min
- Fuzhou BUC: hū
Northern Min
- Jian'ou Romanized: kǔ
Old Chinese
- Baxter (1992): *xaʔ
- Baxter–Sagart (2014): *qʰˤraʔ

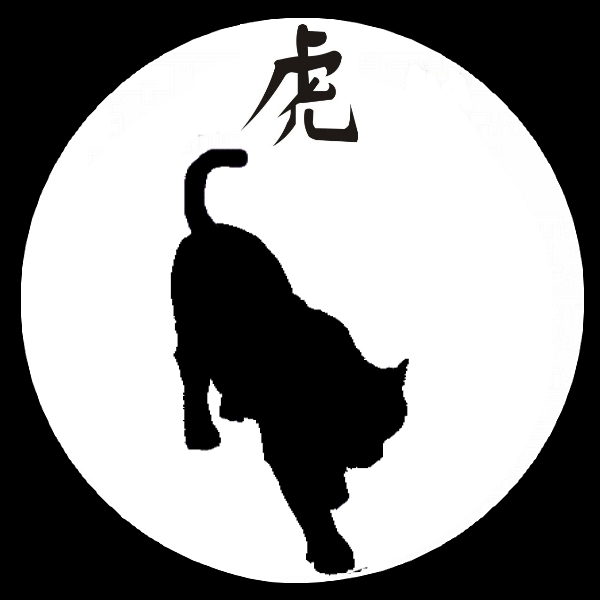
Zodiac tiger, showing the hǔ (虎) character for tiger

The Tiger (虎) is the third of the 12-year cycle of animals which appear in the Chinese zodiac related to the Chinese calendar. The Year of the Tiger is associated with the Earthly Branch symbol 寅.

== Compatibility ==
Sign	Best Match/ Balance (3rd Trine Group)	Average	No Match/ Rival-Enemy-Obstacle (Opposite Sign)
Tiger	Horse, Dog, Pig	Rabbit, Goat, Rooster, Dragon, Rat, Ox	Monkey, Snake

Cycle: (Trine Group) Tiger needs Horse, Horse needs Dog, Dog needs Tiger; (Opposite Sign) but his rival opposes the Monkey. Tiger can not get along with Snake.

== Years and the Five Elements ==
People born within these date ranges can be said to have been born in the "Year of the Tiger", while bearing the following elemental sign:

Start date	End date	Heavenly branch
18 February 1806	6 February 1807	Fire Tiger
5 February 1818	25 January 1819	Earth Tiger
25 January 1830	12 February 1831	Metal Tiger
10 February 1842	29 January 1843	Water Tiger
29 January 1854	16 February 1855	Wood Tiger
15 February 1866	4 February 1867	Fire Tiger
2 February 1878	21 January 1879	Earth Tiger
21 January 1890	8 February 1891	Metal Tiger
8 February 1902	28 January 1903	Water Tiger
26 January 1914	13 February 1915	Wood Tiger
13 February 1926	1 February 1927	Fire Tiger
31 January 1938	18 February 1939	Earth Tiger
17 February 1950	5 February 1951	Metal Tiger
5 February 1962	24 January 1963	Water Tiger
23 January 1974	10 February 1975	Wood Tiger
9 February 1986	28 January 1987	Fire Tiger
28 January 1998	15 February 1999	Earth Tiger
14 February 2010	2 February 2011	Metal Tiger
1 February 2022	21 January 2023	Water Tiger
19 February 2034	7 February 2035	Wood Tiger
6 February 2046	25 January 2047	Fire Tiger
24 January 2058	10 February 2059	Earth Tiger
11 February 2070	30 January 2071	Metal Tiger
29 January 2082	16 February 2083	Water Tiger
15 February 2094	04 February 2095	Wood Tiger
4 February 2106	23 January 2107	Fire Tiger
22 January 2118	9 February 2119	Earth Tiger
8 February 2130	28 January 2131	Metal Tiger
27 January 2142	14 February 2143	Water Tiger
12 February 2154	1 February 2155	Wood Tiger
1 February 2166	20 January 2167	Fire Tiger
18 February 2178	6 February 2179	Earth Tiger
5 February 2190	24 January 2191	Metal Tiger

== Basic astrology elements ==
Earthly branches:	yín (寅)
The Five Elements:	Wood
Cardinal Point:	North east (NE)
Yin/Yang:	Yang
Lunar Month:	February 7 to March 6
Earthly Branch Ruling Hours:	3:00 a.m. to 4:59 a.m
Lucky Numbers:	1, 3, 4; avoid: 6, 7, 8
Lucky Flowers:	Cineraria
Lucky Colors:	Blue, grey, orange; Avoid: gold, silver
Season:	Winter
Lucky/Associated Countries:	Russia, Serbia, Armenia, Vietnam, Tajikistan, Bulgaria

== See also ==
- Tiger
- Burmese zodiac
