= AD 149 =

149 in various calendars
- Gregorian calendar: 149; CXLIX
- Ab urbe condita: 902
- Assyrian calendar: 4899
- Balinese saka calendar: 70–71
- Bengali calendar: −445 – −444
- Berber calendar: 1099
- Buddhist calendar: 693
- Burmese calendar: −489
- Byzantine calendar: 5657–5658
- Chinese calendar: 戊子年 (Earth Rat); 2846 or 2639 — to — 己丑年 (Earth Ox); 2847 or 2640
- Coptic calendar: −135 – −134
- Discordian calendar: 1315
- Ethiopian calendar: 141–142
- Hebrew calendar: 3909–3910
- Hindu calendars
- Vikram Samvat: 205–206
- Shaka Samvat: 70–71
- Kali Yuga: 3249–3250
- Holocene calendar: 10149
- Iranian calendar: 473 BP – 472 BP
- Islamic calendar: 488 BH – 487 BH
- Javanese calendar: 24–25
- Julian calendar: 149; CXLIX
- Korean calendar: 2482
- Minguo calendar: 1763 before ROC 民前1763年
- Nanakshahi calendar: −1319
- Seleucid era: 460/461 AG
- Thai solar calendar: 691–692
- Tibetan calendar: ས་ཕོ་བྱི་བ་ལོ་ (male Earth-Rat); 275 or −106 or −878 — to — ས་མོ་གླང་ལོ་ (female Earth-Ox); 276 or −105 or −877

Year 149 (CXLIX) was a common year starting on Tuesday of the Julian calendar. At the time, it was known as the Year of the Consulship of Scipio and Priscus (or, less frequently, year 902 Ab urbe condita). The denomination 149 for this year has been used since the early medieval period, when the Anno Domini calendar era became the prevalent method in Europe for naming years.

== Births ==
- Sima Fang (or Jiangong), Chinese official and scholar of the Han dynasty (d. 219)
