= AD 133 =

133 in various calendars
- Gregorian calendar: 133; CXXXIII
- Ab urbe condita: 886
- Assyrian calendar: 4883
- Balinese saka calendar: 54–55
- Bengali calendar: −461 – −460
- Berber calendar: 1083
- Buddhist calendar: 677
- Burmese calendar: −505
- Byzantine calendar: 5641–5642
- Chinese calendar: 壬申年 (Water Monkey); 2830 or 2623 — to — 癸酉年 (Water Rooster); 2831 or 2624
- Coptic calendar: −151 – −150
- Discordian calendar: 1299
- Ethiopian calendar: 125–126
- Hebrew calendar: 3893–3894
- Hindu calendars
- Vikram Samvat: 189–190
- Shaka Samvat: 54–55
- Kali Yuga: 3233–3234
- Holocene calendar: 10133
- Iranian calendar: 489 BP – 488 BP
- Islamic calendar: 504 BH – 503 BH
- Javanese calendar: 8–9
- Julian calendar: 133; CXXXIII
- Korean calendar: 2466
- Minguo calendar: 1779 before ROC 民前1779年
- Nanakshahi calendar: −1335
- Seleucid era: 444/445 AG
- Thai solar calendar: 675–676
- Tibetan calendar: ཆུ་ཕོ་སྤྲེ་ལོ་ (male Water-Monkey); 259 or −122 or −894 — to — ཆུ་མོ་བྱ་ལོ་ (female Water-Bird); 260 or −121 or −893

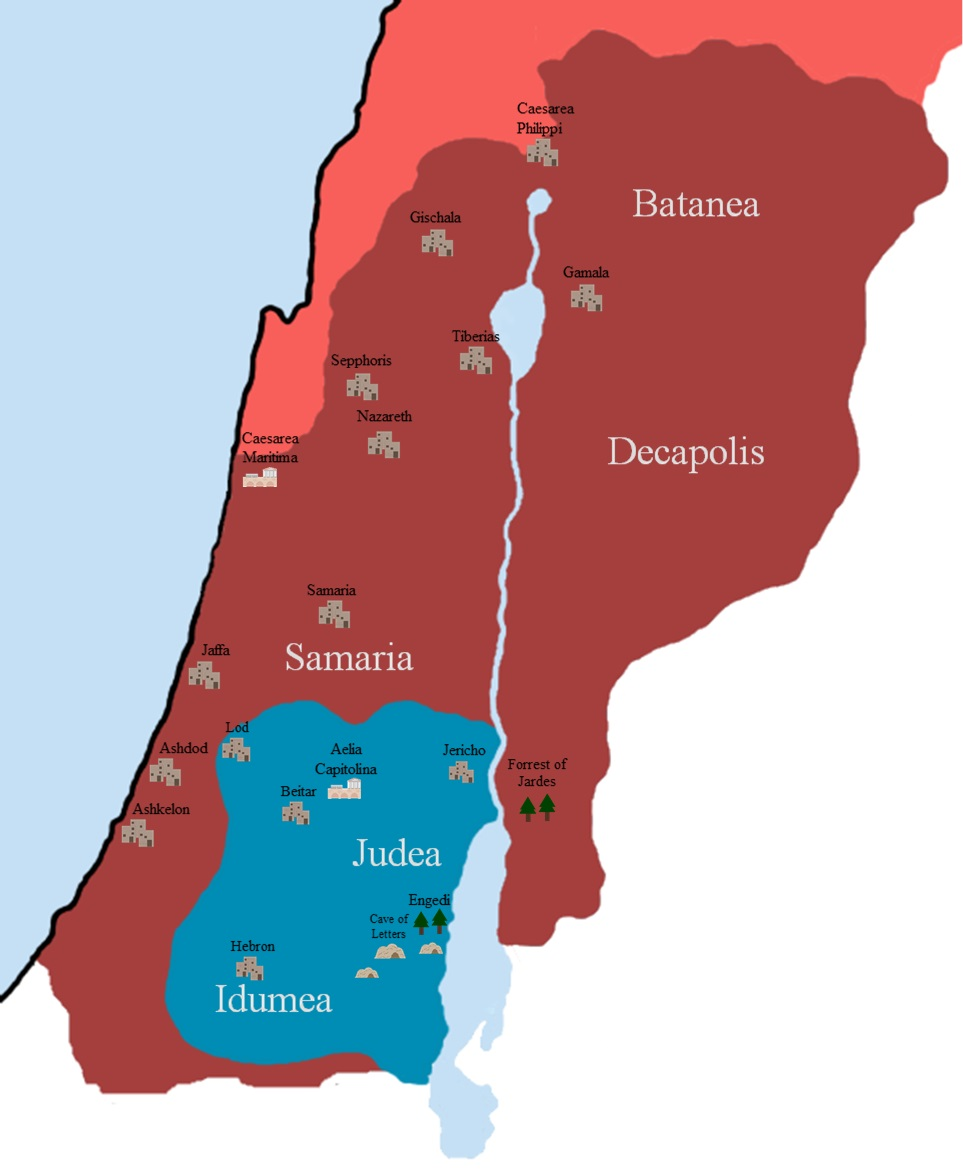
Territory held by Simon bar Kokhba in Judea (modern Israel) and his rebels.

Year 133 (CXXXIII) was a common year starting on Wednesday of the Julian calendar. At the time, it was known as the Year of the Consulship of Hiberus and Sisenna (or, less frequently, year 886 Ab urbe condita). The denomination 133 for this year has been used since the early medieval period, when the Anno Domini calendar era became the prevalent method in Europe for naming years.

== Events ==
=== By place ===
==== Roman Empire ====
- Bar Kokhba Revolt: Sextus Julius Severus, Roman governor of Britain, is sent to Judea (in 136 renamed Syria Palaestina) to quell the revolt. Jewish rebels, led by Simon bar Kokhba and Eleazar, cut off the vital supply lines and Roman garrisons in Palestine. Despite Roman reinforcements from Syria and Egypt, they establish an independent state in Judea.

== Births ==
- January 30 – Didius Julianus, Roman emperor (according to Cassius Dio) (d. 193)
- Athenagoras of Athens, Greek Christian apologist (d. 190)

== Deaths ==
- Cyriacus, bishop of Jerusalem (approximate date)
