= 32 BC =

32 BC in various calendars
- Gregorian calendar: 32 BC; XXXII BC
- Ab urbe condita: 722
- Ancient Egypt era: XXXIII dynasty, 292
- Pharaoh: Cleopatra VII, 20
- Ancient Greek Olympiad (summer): 187th Olympiad (victor)¹
- Assyrian calendar: 4719
- Balinese saka calendar: N/A
- Bengali calendar: −625 – −624
- Berber calendar: 919
- Buddhist calendar: 513
- Burmese calendar: −669
- Byzantine calendar: 5477–5478
- Chinese calendar: 戊子年 (Earth Rat); 2666 or 2459 — to — 己丑年 (Earth Ox); 2667 or 2460
- Coptic calendar: −315 – −314
- Discordian calendar: 1135
- Ethiopian calendar: −39 – −38
- Hebrew calendar: 3729–3730
- Hindu calendars
- Vikram Samvat: 25–26
- Shaka Samvat: N/A
- Kali Yuga: 3069–3070
- Holocene calendar: 9969
- Iranian calendar: 653 BP – 652 BP
- Islamic calendar: 673 BH – 672 BH
- Javanese calendar: N/A
- Julian calendar: 32 BC; XXXII BC
- Korean calendar: 2302
- Minguo calendar: 1943 before ROC 民前1943年
- Nanakshahi calendar: −1499
- Seleucid era: 280/281 AG
- Thai solar calendar: 511–512
- Tibetan calendar: ས་ཕོ་བྱི་བ་ལོ་ (male Earth-Rat); 95 or −286 or −1058 — to — ས་མོ་གླང་ལོ་ (female Earth-Ox); 96 or −285 or −1057

Year 32 BC was either a common year starting on Monday or Tuesday or a leap year starting on Sunday, Monday or Tuesday of the Julian calendar (the sources differ, see leap year error for further information) and a common year starting on Monday of the Proleptic Julian calendar. At the time, it was known as the Year of the Consulship of Ahenobarbus and Sosius (or, less frequently, year 722 Ab urbe condita). The denomination 32 BC for this year has been used since the early medieval period, when the Anno Domini calendar era became the prevalent method in Europe for naming years.

== Events ==
=== By place ===
==== Roman Republic ====
- Gnaeus Domitius Ahenobarbus and Gaius Sosius become consuls of Rome.
- Spring – Final War of the Roman Republic: Mark Antony transfers his headquarters from Samos to Athens, where he assembles a fleet of 500 combat vessels and 300 transport ships, crewed by 150,000 men.
- Sparta under Caius Iulius Eurycles, whose father Antony had been ordered to be executed for piracy, declares his support for Octavian. Lappa (modern Argyroupoli) in Attica and Kydonia in Crete revolt against Cleopatra.
- July – The Roman Senate declares war upon Mark Antony and Cleopatra VII. Octavian Caesar is proclaimed dux and the West - Gallic and Spanish provinces, Africa, Sicily and Sardinia - swear an oath (sacramentum) of loyalty to him. In order to assure this oath, Octavian forces the high priest of the Vestal Virgins in Rome to hand over Antony's will, which contains information about the Roman-conquered territories as kingdoms and plans to build a tomb in Alexandria for him and Cleopatra.
- Winter – Antony distributes garrisons along the west coast of Greece, stations the fleet at Actium and establishes his headquarters at Patrae.
- Zacynthus is held by Gaius Sosius, and Methone (Messenia) by Bogud of the royal house of Mauretania, driven into exile by his brother Bocchus II.

== Births ==
- Marcus Valerius Messalla, Roman politician

== Deaths ==
- March 31 – Titus Pomponius Atticus, Roman nobleman
