= AD 74 =

AD 74 in various calendars
- Gregorian calendar: AD 74; LXXIV
- Ab urbe condita: 827
- Assyrian calendar: 4824
- Balinese saka calendar: N/A
- Bengali calendar: −520 – −519
- Berber calendar: 1024
- Buddhist calendar: 618
- Burmese calendar: −564
- Byzantine calendar: 5582–5583
- Chinese calendar: 癸酉年 (Water Rooster); 2771 or 2564 — to — 甲戌年 (Wood Dog); 2772 or 2565
- Coptic calendar: −210 – −209
- Discordian calendar: 1240
- Ethiopian calendar: 66–67
- Hebrew calendar: 3834–3835
- Hindu calendars
- Vikram Samvat: 130–131
- Shaka Samvat: N/A
- Kali Yuga: 3174–3175
- Holocene calendar: 10074
- Iranian calendar: 548 BP – 547 BP
- Islamic calendar: 565 BH – 564 BH
- Javanese calendar: N/A
- Julian calendar: AD 74; LXXIV
- Korean calendar: 2407
- Minguo calendar: 1838 before ROC 民前1838年
- Nanakshahi calendar: −1394
- Seleucid era: 385/386 AG
- Thai solar calendar: 616–617
- Tibetan calendar: ཆུ་མོ་བྱ་ལོ་ (female Water-Bird); 200 or −181 or −953 — to — ཤིང་ཕོ་ཁྱི་ལོ་ (male Wood-Dog); 201 or −180 or −952

AD 74 (LXXIV) was a common year starting on Saturday of the Julian calendar. At the time, it was known as the Year of the Consulship of Titus (third time) and Vespasian (fifth time) (or, less frequently, year 827 Ab urbe condita). The denomination AD 74 for this year has been used since the early medieval period, when the Anno Domini calendar era became the prevalent method in Europe for naming years.

== Events ==
=== By place ===
==== Roman Empire ====
- Emperor Vespasian and his son Titus Caesar Vespasianus become Roman Consuls.
- The Black Forest region is reattached to the Roman Empire.
- December 27 – Vespasian grants generous privileges to doctors and teachers.

==== Asia ====
- Emperor Ming of Han appoints Chen Mu to the revived office of Protector of the Western Regions.
- Chinese generals Dou Gu (Teou Kou) and Geng Bing (Keng Ping) take control of Turpan.

=== By topic ===
==== Arts and Science ====
- Mesopotamia: The last known cuneiform text is written.

== Births ==
- March 18 – Hyginus, bishop of Rome

== Deaths ==
- Caenis, Roman slave and secretary of Antonia Minor (mother of Emperor Claudius) and mistress of Emperor Vespasian
- Polemon II, prince of the Bosporan Kingdom, Pontus, Cilicia and Cappadocia
