= Water pig =

Water pig can refer to:

- The capybara
- The gourami
- Water Pig, a year of the sexagenary cycle
