= 221 =

221 in various calendars
- Gregorian calendar: 221; CCXXI
- Ab urbe condita: 974
- Assyrian calendar: 4971
- Balinese saka calendar: 142–143
- Bengali calendar: −373 – −372
- Berber calendar: 1171
- Buddhist calendar: 765
- Burmese calendar: −417
- Byzantine calendar: 5729–5730
- Chinese calendar: 庚子年 (Metal Rat); 2918 or 2711 — to — 辛丑年 (Metal Ox); 2919 or 2712
- Coptic calendar: −63 – −62
- Discordian calendar: 1387
- Ethiopian calendar: 213–214
- Hebrew calendar: 3981–3982
- Hindu calendars
- Vikram Samvat: 277–278
- Shaka Samvat: 142–143
- Kali Yuga: 3321–3322
- Holocene calendar: 10221
- Iranian calendar: 401 BP – 400 BP
- Islamic calendar: 413 BH – 412 BH
- Javanese calendar: 99–100
- Julian calendar: 221; CCXXI
- Korean calendar: 2554
- Minguo calendar: 1691 before ROC 民前1691年
- Nanakshahi calendar: −1247
- Seleucid era: 532/533 AG
- Thai solar calendar: 763–764
- Tibetan calendar: ལྕགས་ཕོ་བྱི་བ་ལོ་ (male Iron-Rat); 347 or −34 or −806 — to — ལྕགས་མོ་གླང་ལོ་ (female Iron-Ox); 348 or −33 or −805

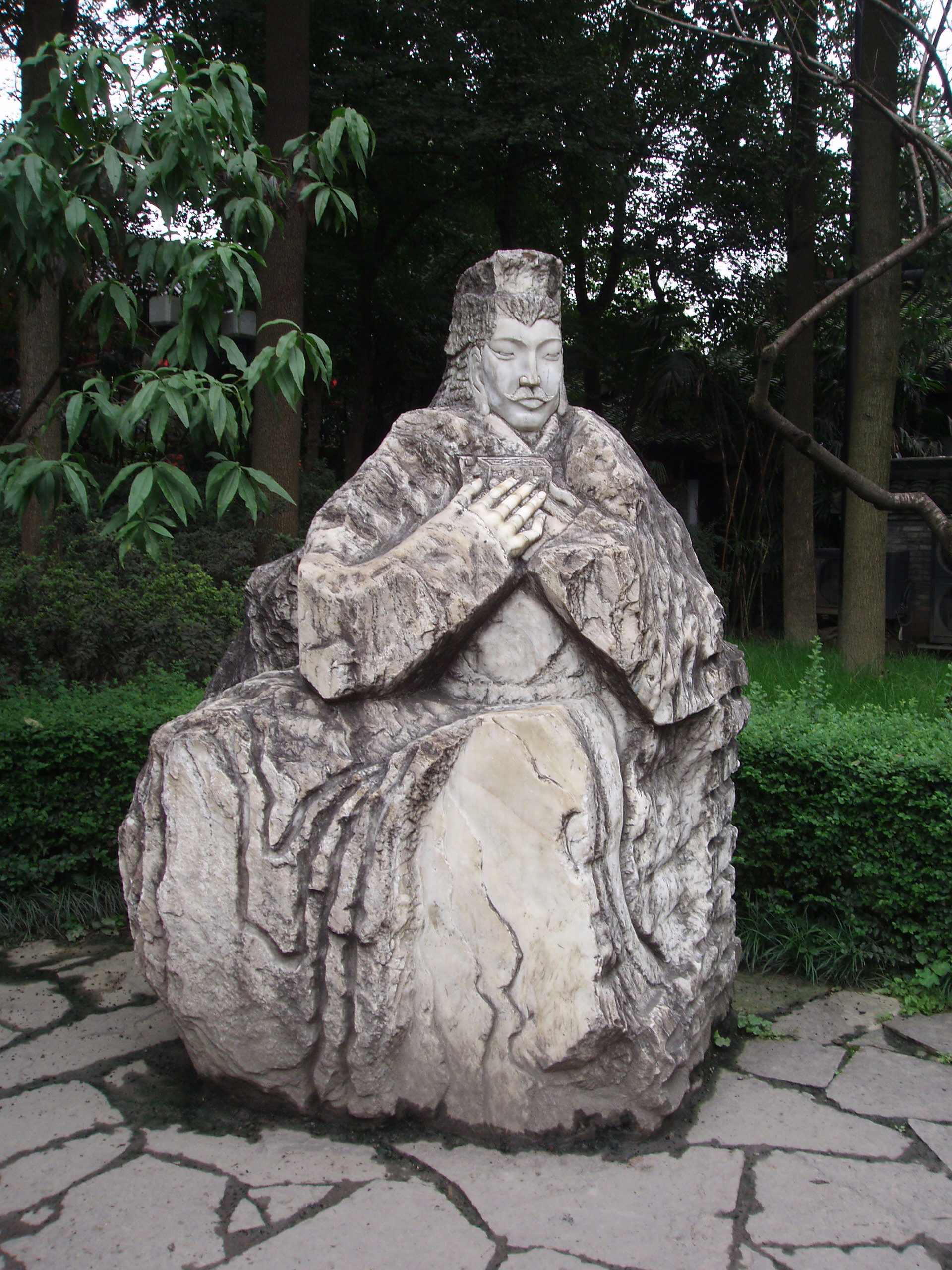
Statue of Liu Bei in the temple of Zhuge Liang, Chengdu (China)

Year 221 (CCXXI) was a common year starting on Monday of the Julian calendar. At the time, it was known as the Year of the Consulship of Gratus and Vitellius (or, less frequently, year 974 Ab urbe condita). The denomination 221 for this year has been used since the early medieval period, when the Anno Domini calendar era became the prevalent method in Europe for naming years.

== Events ==
=== By place ===
==== Roman Empire ====
- June 26 – Emperor Elagabalus adopts his cousin Alexander Severus as his heir, and receives the title of Caesar.
- July – Elagabalus is forced to divorce Aquilia Severa, and marries his third wife Annia Faustina. After five months he returns to Severa, and claims that the original divorce is invalid. The marriage is symbolic, because Elagabalus appears to be homosexual or bisexual. According to the historian Cassius Dio, he has a stable relationship with his chariot driver, the slave Hierocles.

==== Asia ====
- May 15 – Liu Bei, Chinese warlord and descendant of the imperial clan of the Han dynasty, proclaims himself emperor in Chengdu, Sichuan, and establishes the state of Shu Han.

== Births ==
- Liu Ling, Chinese poet and scholar (d. 300)
- Yang Hu, Chinese general and politician (d. 278)

== Deaths ==
- August 4 – Lady Zhen, Chinese noblewoman (b. 183)
- Dong He (or Youzai), Chinese official and politician
- Mi Zhu, Chinese general and politician (b. 165)
- Yu Jin, Chinese general serving under Cao Cao
- Zhang Fei, Chinese general and politician
