= AD 138 =

138 in various calendars
- Gregorian calendar: 138; CXXXVIII
- Ab urbe condita: 891
- Assyrian calendar: 4888
- Balinese saka calendar: 59–60
- Bengali calendar: −456 – −455
- Berber calendar: 1088
- Buddhist calendar: 682
- Burmese calendar: −500
- Byzantine calendar: 5646–5647
- Chinese calendar: 丁丑年 (Fire Ox); 2835 or 2628 — to — 戊寅年 (Earth Tiger); 2836 or 2629
- Coptic calendar: −146 – −145
- Discordian calendar: 1304
- Ethiopian calendar: 130–131
- Hebrew calendar: 3898–3899
- Hindu calendars
- Vikram Samvat: 194–195
- Shaka Samvat: 59–60
- Kali Yuga: 3238–3239
- Holocene calendar: 10138
- Iranian calendar: 484 BP – 483 BP
- Islamic calendar: 499 BH – 498 BH
- Javanese calendar: 13–14
- Julian calendar: 138; CXXXVIII
- Korean calendar: 2471
- Minguo calendar: 1774 before ROC 民前1774年
- Nanakshahi calendar: −1330
- Seleucid era: 449/450 AG
- Thai solar calendar: 680–681
- Tibetan calendar: མེ་མོ་གླང་ལོ་ (female Fire-Ox); 264 or −117 or −889 — to — ས་ཕོ་སྟག་ལོ་ (male Earth-Tiger); 265 or −116 or −888

Year 138 (CXXXVIII) was a common year starting on Tuesday of the Julian calendar. At the time, it was known as the Year of the Consulship of Niger and Camerinus (or, less frequently, year 891 Ab urbe condita). The denomination 138 for this year has been used since the early medieval period, when the Anno Domini calendar era became the prevalent method in Europe for naming years.

== Events ==
=== By place ===
==== Roman Empire ====
- February 25 – Emperor Hadrian makes Antoninus Pius his successor, on condition that he adopt Marcus Aurelius and Lucius Verus.
- July 10 – Hadrian dies after a heart failure at Baiae, and is buried at Rome in the Gardens of Domitia beside his wife, Vibia Sabina.
- Antoninus Pius succeeds Hadrian as Roman Emperor, and asks the Senate to confer divine honors for Hadrian.
- Construction begins on the Theater of Philadelphia (Amman).
- Hadrian's Villa, Tivoli, Italy, is finished.

==== Asia ====
- In Jiaozhi (present-day northern Vietnam), during the Second Era of Northern Domination, a peace agreement was made between the Han governor and the Cham rebels following their uprising in 137. Historical records do not clarify the terms of the agreement.

=== By topic ===
==== Commerce ====
- The silver content of the Roman denarius falls to 75 percent under Emperor Antoninus Pius, down from 87 percent under Hadrian.

== Births ==
- Han Zhidi, Chinese emperor of the Han dynasty (d. 146)
- Marcus Ummidius Quadratus, Roman politician (d. 182)

== Deaths ==
- January 1 – Lucius Aelius Caesar, Roman politician and adopted son of Hadrian (b. 101)
- July 10 – Hadrian, Roman emperor died at Baie (b. AD 76)
- Zenobius, Greek sophist and writer (b. 117)
