= AD 77 =

AD 77 in various calendars
- Gregorian calendar: AD 77; LXXVII
- Ab urbe condita: 830
- Assyrian calendar: 4827
- Balinese saka calendar: −2 – −1
- Bengali calendar: −517 – −516
- Berber calendar: 1027
- Buddhist calendar: 621
- Burmese calendar: −561
- Byzantine calendar: 5585–5586
- Chinese calendar: 丙子年 (Fire Rat); 2774 or 2567 — to — 丁丑年 (Fire Ox); 2775 or 2568
- Coptic calendar: −207 – −206
- Discordian calendar: 1243
- Ethiopian calendar: 69–70
- Hebrew calendar: 3837–3838
- Hindu calendars
- Vikram Samvat: 133–134
- Shaka Samvat: N/A
- Kali Yuga: 3177–3178
- Holocene calendar: 10077
- Iranian calendar: 545 BP – 544 BP
- Islamic calendar: 562 BH – 561 BH
- Javanese calendar: N/A
- Julian calendar: AD 77; LXXVII
- Korean calendar: 2410
- Minguo calendar: 1835 before ROC 民前1835年
- Nanakshahi calendar: −1391
- Seleucid era: 388/389 AG
- Thai solar calendar: 619–620
- Tibetan calendar: མེ་ཕོ་བྱི་བ་ལོ་ (male Fire-Rat); 203 or −178 or −950 — to — མེ་མོ་གླང་ལོ་ (female Fire-Ox); 204 or −177 or −949

AD 77 (LXXVII) was a common year starting on Wednesday of the Julian calendar. At the time, it was known as the Year of the Consulship of Vespasian and Titus (or, less frequently, year 830 Ab urbe condita). The denomination AD 77 for this year has been used since the early medieval period, when the Anno Domini calendar era became the prevalent method in Europe for naming years.

== Events ==
=== By place ===
==== Roman Empire ====
- Gnaeus Julius Agricola is named governor of Britannia, a post he occupies until AD 84. He extends the Roman influence to the mouth of the River Clyde (Scotland), and builds fortifications.
- Agricola subdues the Ordovices in Wales, and pursues the remnants of the tribe to Anglesey, the holy island of the Druids.
- The Caledonian tribes in Scotland form a confederacy of 30,000 warriors, under the leadership of Calgacus.
- Winter – Agricola conquers Anglesey, and disperses his army to their winter quarters.

==== Asia ====
- King Giru of Baekje succeeds to the throne of Baekje in the Korean Peninsula.

=== By topic ===
==== Arts and sciences ====
- Pliny the Elder publishes the first ten books of Naturalis Historia.
- The Romans develop a simple method of distillation.

== Deaths ==
- Daru of Baekje, Korean king
