= AD 183 =

183 in various calendars
- Gregorian calendar: 183; CLXXXIII
- Ab urbe condita: 936
- Assyrian calendar: 4933
- Balinese saka calendar: 104–105
- Bengali calendar: −411 – −410
- Berber calendar: 1133
- Buddhist calendar: 727
- Burmese calendar: −455
- Byzantine calendar: 5691–5692
- Chinese calendar: 壬戌年 (Water Dog); 2880 or 2673 — to — 癸亥年 (Water Pig); 2881 or 2674
- Coptic calendar: −101 – −100
- Discordian calendar: 1349
- Ethiopian calendar: 175–176
- Hebrew calendar: 3943–3944
- Hindu calendars
- Vikram Samvat: 239–240
- Shaka Samvat: 104–105
- Kali Yuga: 3283–3284
- Holocene calendar: 10183
- Iranian calendar: 439 BP – 438 BP
- Islamic calendar: 453 BH – 451 BH
- Javanese calendar: 59–60
- Julian calendar: 183; CLXXXIII
- Korean calendar: 2516
- Minguo calendar: 1729 before ROC 民前1729年
- Nanakshahi calendar: −1285
- Seleucid era: 494/495 AG
- Thai solar calendar: 725–726
- Tibetan calendar: ཆུ་ཕོ་ཁྱི་ལོ་ (male Water-Dog); 309 or −72 or −844 — to — ཆུ་མོ་ཕག་ལོ་ (female Water-Boar); 310 or −71 or −843

Year 183 (CLXXXIII) was a common year starting on Tuesday of the Julian calendar. At the time, it was known in Rome as the Year of the Consulship of Aurelius and Victorinus (or, less frequently, year 936 Ab urbe condita). The denomination 183 for this year has been used since the early medieval period, when the Anno Domini calendar era became the prevalent method in Europe for naming years.

== Events ==
- In Jiaozhi (present-day northern Vietnam), during the Second Era of Northern Domination, the local army launches a coup, captures the governor, and subsequently executes him. After the coup, Emperor Ling appoints a new Jiaozhi governor, who brings peace to the region, and is praised by the residents.

== Births ==
- January 26 – Lady Zhen, wife of the Cao Wei state Emperor Cao Pi (d. 221)
- Hu Zong, Chinese general, official and poet of the Eastern Wu state (d. 242)
- Liu Zan (Zhengming), Chinese general of the Eastern Wu state (d. 255)
- Lu Xun, Chinese general and politician of the Eastern Wu state (d. 245)
