= AD 122 =

122 in various calendars
- Gregorian calendar: 122; CXXII
- Ab urbe condita: 875
- Assyrian calendar: 4872
- Balinese saka calendar: 43–44
- Bengali calendar: −472 – −471
- Berber calendar: 1072
- Buddhist calendar: 666
- Burmese calendar: −516
- Byzantine calendar: 5630–5631
- Chinese calendar: 辛酉年 (Metal Rooster); 2819 or 2612 — to — 壬戌年 (Water Dog); 2820 or 2613
- Coptic calendar: −162 – −161
- Discordian calendar: 1288
- Ethiopian calendar: 114–115
- Hebrew calendar: 3882–3883
- Hindu calendars
- Vikram Samvat: 178–179
- Shaka Samvat: 43–44
- Kali Yuga: 3222–3223
- Holocene calendar: 10122
- Iranian calendar: 500 BP – 499 BP
- Islamic calendar: 515 BH – 514 BH
- Javanese calendar: N/A
- Julian calendar: 122; CXXII
- Korean calendar: 2455
- Minguo calendar: 1790 before ROC 民前1790年
- Nanakshahi calendar: −1346
- Seleucid era: 433/434 AG
- Thai solar calendar: 664–665
- Tibetan calendar: ལྕགས་མོ་བྱ་ལོ་ (female Iron-Bird); 248 or −133 or −905 — to — ཆུ་ཕོ་ཁྱི་ལོ་ (male Water-Dog); 249 or −132 or −904

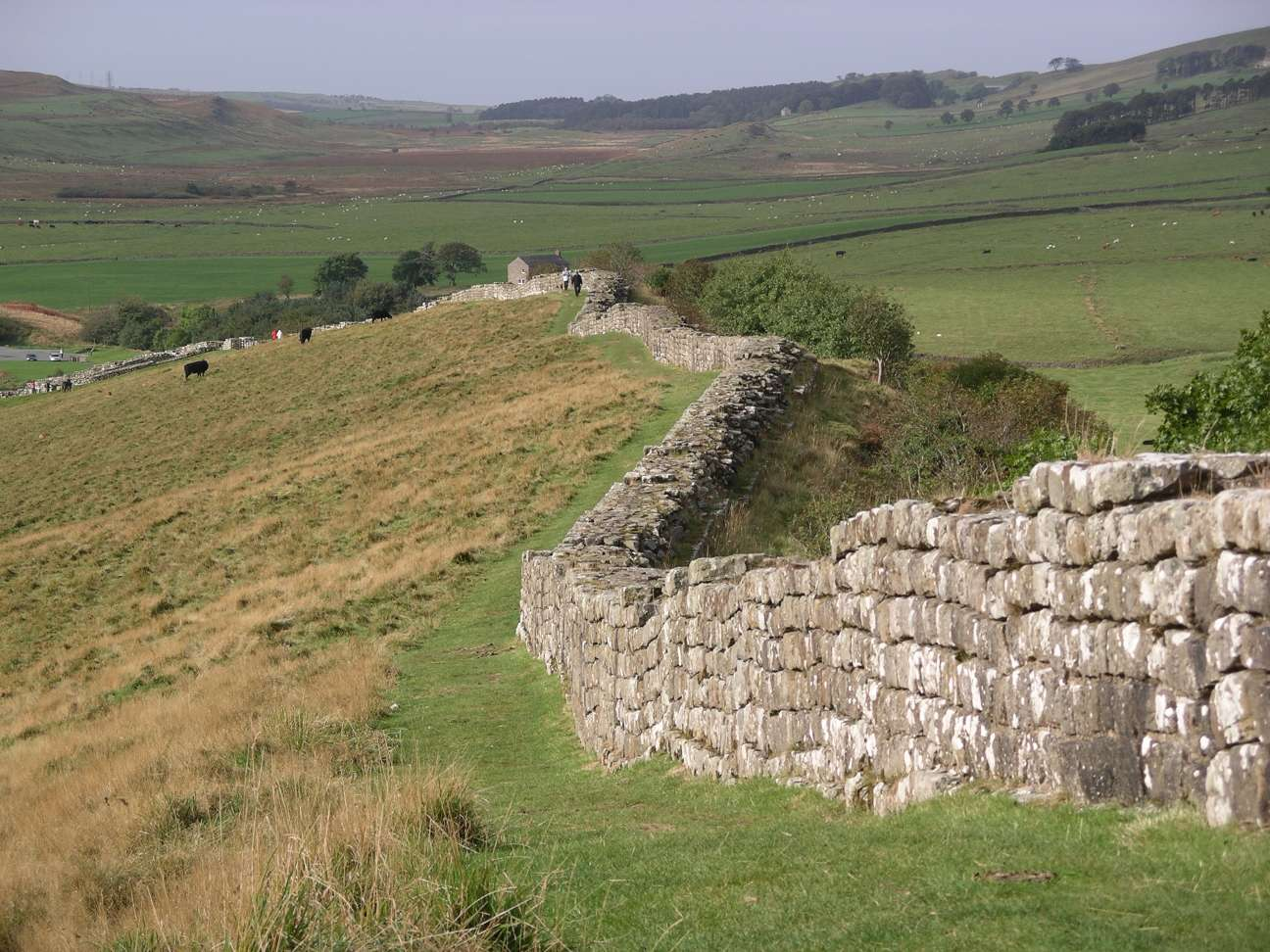
Hadrian's Wall near Greenhead

Year 122 (CXXII) was a common year starting on Wednesday of the Julian calendar. At the time, it was known as the Year of the Consulship of Aviola and Neratius (or, less frequently, year 875 Ab urbe condita). The denomination 122 for this year has been used since the early medieval period, when the Anno Domini calendar era became the prevalent method in Europe for naming years.

== Events ==
=== By place ===
==== Roman Empire ====
- Emperor Hadrian orders that a 73-mile (117-kilometer) wall be built to mark the northern Roman Empire while personally visiting the area. Hadrian's Wall, as it comes to be known, is intended to keep the Caledonians, Picts and other tribes at bay.
- Vindolanda, a Roman auxiliary fort (castrum) in northern England, is garrisoned by cohort VIII Batavorum.
- September 13 – The building of Hadrian's Wall begins.
- Hadrian gives up the territories conquered in Scotland.

==== Asia ====
- Change of era name from Jianguang (2nd year) to Yanguang of the Chinese Eastern Han dynasty.
