= AD 63 =

AD 63 in various calendars
- Gregorian calendar: AD 63; LXIII
- Ab urbe condita: 816
- Assyrian calendar: 4813
- Balinese saka calendar: N/A
- Bengali calendar: −531 – −530
- Berber calendar: 1013
- Buddhist calendar: 607
- Burmese calendar: −575
- Byzantine calendar: 5571–5572
- Chinese calendar: 壬戌年 (Water Dog); 2760 or 2553 — to — 癸亥年 (Water Pig); 2761 or 2554
- Coptic calendar: −221 – −220
- Discordian calendar: 1229
- Ethiopian calendar: 55–56
- Hebrew calendar: 3823–3824
- Hindu calendars
- Vikram Samvat: 119–120
- Shaka Samvat: N/A
- Kali Yuga: 3163–3164
- Holocene calendar: 10063
- Iranian calendar: 559 BP – 558 BP
- Islamic calendar: 576 BH – 575 BH
- Javanese calendar: N/A
- Julian calendar: AD 63; LXIII
- Korean calendar: 2396
- Minguo calendar: 1849 before ROC 民前1849年
- Nanakshahi calendar: −1405
- Seleucid era: 374/375 AG
- Thai solar calendar: 605–606
- Tibetan calendar: ཆུ་ཕོ་ཁྱི་ལོ་ (male Water-Dog); 189 or −192 or −964 — to — ཆུ་མོ་ཕག་ལོ་ (female Water-Boar); 190 or −191 or −963

AD 63 (LXIII) was a common year starting on Saturday of the Julian calendar. At the time, it was known as the Year of the Consulship of Regulus and Rufus (or, less frequently, year 816 Ab urbe condita). The denomination AD 63 for this year has been used since the early medieval period, when the Anno Domini calendar era became the prevalent method in Europe for naming years.

== Events ==
=== By place ===
==== Roman Empire ====
- Vespasian becomes governor of Africa (estimated year).
- Gnaeus Domitius Corbulo is restored to command after the Roman debacle at the Battle of Rhandeia. He invades Armenia and defeats Tiridates I, who accepts Roman sovereignty. Parthia withdraws from the war.
- Pompeii, the city at the foot of Mount Vesuvius, builds a new monumental forum, after the town is heavily damaged by a strong earthquake.

=== By topic ===
==== Religion ====
- According to legend, Joseph of Arimathea goes to Glastonbury on the first Christian mission to Britain.
- Apostle Paul possibly visits Spain.

==== Arts and sciences ====
- Aulus Cornelius Celsus writes a dictionary (encyclopedia) on the arts and sciences.

== Births ==
- Dou, Chinese empress of the Han dynasty (d. AD 97)

== Deaths ==
- Claudia Augusta, daughter of Nero
- Mark the Evangelist (traditional date) (see AD 61)
