= AD 123 =

123 in various calendars
- Gregorian calendar: 123; CXXIII
- Ab urbe condita: 876
- Assyrian calendar: 4873
- Balinese saka calendar: 44–45
- Bengali calendar: −471 – −470
- Berber calendar: 1073
- Buddhist calendar: 667
- Burmese calendar: −515
- Byzantine calendar: 5631–5632
- Chinese calendar: 壬戌年 (Water Dog); 2820 or 2613 — to — 癸亥年 (Water Pig); 2821 or 2614
- Coptic calendar: −161 – −160
- Discordian calendar: 1289
- Ethiopian calendar: 115–116
- Hebrew calendar: 3883–3884
- Hindu calendars
- Vikram Samvat: 179–180
- Shaka Samvat: 44–45
- Kali Yuga: 3223–3224
- Holocene calendar: 10123
- Iranian calendar: 499 BP – 498 BP
- Islamic calendar: 514 BH – 513 BH
- Javanese calendar: N/A
- Julian calendar: 123; CXXIII
- Korean calendar: 2456
- Minguo calendar: 1789 before ROC 民前1789年
- Nanakshahi calendar: −1345
- Seleucid era: 434/435 AG
- Thai solar calendar: 665–666
- Tibetan calendar: ཆུ་ཕོ་ཁྱི་ལོ་ (male Water-Dog); 249 or −132 or −904 — to — ཆུ་མོ་ཕག་ལོ་ (female Water-Boar); 250 or −131 or −903

Year 123 (CXXIII) was a common year starting on Thursday of the Julian calendar. At the time, it was known as the Year of the Consulship of Paetinus and Apronius (or, less frequently, year 876 Ab urbe condita). The denomination 123 for this year has been used since the early medieval period, when the Anno Domini calendar era became the prevalent method in Europe for naming years.

== Events ==
=== By place ===
==== Roman Empire ====
- Emperor Hadrian averts a war with Parthia by a personal meeting with Osroes I (according to the Historia Augusta, disputed).
- Housesteads Fort is constructed on Hadrian's Wall north of Bardon Mill.
- Hadrian's Villa at Tivoli is built.
- The Temple of Al-Lat in Palmyra is dedicated somewhere between this year and 164 AD.

==== Asia ====
- In China, Ban Yong, son of Ban Chao, reestablishes the Chinese control over the Tarim Basin.
- The Chinese government establishes Aide of the Western Regions over the Tarim Basin.

==== Africa ====
- Hadrian leads a punitive campaign against Berbers who had been raiding Roman towns in Roman Mauretania.

=== By topic ===
==== Arts and sciences ====
- Chinese scientist Zhang Heng adjusts the calendar to bring it into line with the four seasons.

== Births ==
- Annia Cornificia Faustina, sister of Marcus Aurelius (d. 158)
