= AD 86 =

AD 86 in various calendars
- Gregorian calendar: AD 86; LXXXVI
- Ab urbe condita: 839
- Assyrian calendar: 4836
- Balinese saka calendar: 7–8
- Bengali calendar: −508 – −507
- Berber calendar: 1036
- Buddhist calendar: 630
- Burmese calendar: −552
- Byzantine calendar: 5594–5595
- Chinese calendar: 乙酉年 (Wood Rooster); 2783 or 2576 — to — 丙戌年 (Fire Dog); 2784 or 2577
- Coptic calendar: −198 – −197
- Discordian calendar: 1252
- Ethiopian calendar: 78–79
- Hebrew calendar: 3846–3847
- Hindu calendars
- Vikram Samvat: 142–143
- Shaka Samvat: 7–8
- Kali Yuga: 3186–3187
- Holocene calendar: 10086
- Iranian calendar: 536 BP – 535 BP
- Islamic calendar: 552 BH – 551 BH
- Javanese calendar: N/A
- Julian calendar: AD 86; LXXXVI
- Korean calendar: 2419
- Minguo calendar: 1826 before ROC 民前1826年
- Nanakshahi calendar: −1382
- Seleucid era: 397/398 AG
- Thai solar calendar: 628–629
- Tibetan calendar: ཤིང་མོ་བྱ་ལོ་ (female Wood-Bird); 212 or −169 or −941 — to — མེ་ཕོ་ཁྱི་ལོ་ (male Fire-Dog); 213 or −168 or −940

AD 86 (LXXXVI) was a common year starting on Sunday of the Julian calendar. At the time, it was known as the Year of the Consulship of Augustus and Petronianus (or, less frequently, year 839 Ab urbe condita). The denomination AD 86 for this year has been used since the early medieval period, when the Anno Domini calendar era became the prevalent method in Europe for naming years.

== Events ==
=== By place ===
==== Roman Empire ====
- Emperor Domitian introduces the Capitoline Games.
- Roman general (and future emperor) Trajan begins a campaign to crush an uprising in Germania.
- Germania is divided into two provinces, Germania Inferior and Germania Superior (approximate date).
- Martial publishes Books I and II of the Epigrams.

==== Dacia ====
- First Battle of Tapae: Roman legions face disaster in Dacia, when Roman general Cornelius Fuscus launches a powerful offensive that becomes a failure. Encircled in the valley of Timi, he dies along with his entire army. Rome must pay tribute to the Dacians in exchange for a vague recognition of Rome's importance.

==== Asia ====
- Ban Gu (Pan Kou) and his sister Ban Zhao (Pan Tchao) compose the History of China.

== Births ==
- September 19 – Antoninus Pius, Roman emperor (d. 161)

== Deaths ==
- June 9 – Cornelius Fuscus, Roman general and praetorian prefect
