= AD 78 =

AD 78 in various calendars
- Gregorian calendar: AD 78; LXXVIII
- Ab urbe condita: 831
- Assyrian calendar: 4828
- Balinese saka calendar: −1 – 0
- Bengali calendar: −516 – −515
- Berber calendar: 1028
- Buddhist calendar: 622
- Burmese calendar: −560
- Byzantine calendar: 5586–5587
- Chinese calendar: 丁丑年 (Fire Ox); 2775 or 2568 — to — 戊寅年 (Earth Tiger); 2776 or 2569
- Coptic calendar: −206 – −205
- Discordian calendar: 1244
- Ethiopian calendar: 70–71
- Hebrew calendar: 3838–3839
- Hindu calendars
- Vikram Samvat: 134–135
- Shaka Samvat: −1 – 0
- Kali Yuga: 3178–3179
- Holocene calendar: 10078
- Iranian calendar: 544 BP – 543 BP
- Islamic calendar: 561 BH – 560 BH
- Javanese calendar: N/A
- Julian calendar: AD 78; LXXVIII
- Korean calendar: 2411
- Minguo calendar: 1834 before ROC 民前1834年
- Nanakshahi calendar: −1390
- Seleucid era: 389/390 AG
- Thai solar calendar: 620–621
- Tibetan calendar: མེ་མོ་གླང་ལོ་ (female Fire-Ox); 204 or −177 or −949 — to — ས་ཕོ་སྟག་ལོ་ (male Earth-Tiger); 205 or −176 or −948

AD 78 (LXXVIII) was a common year starting on Thursday of the Julian calendar. At the time, it was known as the Year of the Consulship of Novius and Commodus (or, less frequently, year 831 Ab urbe condita). The denomination AD 78 for this year has been used since the early medieval period, when the Anno Domini calendar era became the prevalent method in Europe for naming years.

== Events ==
=== By place ===
==== Roman Empire ====
- The Romans conquer the Ordovices, located in present-day northern Wales, as well as the Silures.
- Gnaeus Julius Agricola replaces Sextus Julius Frontinus as governor of Roman Britain, which leads to the conquering of portions of Wales and northern England.

==== Asia ====
- Indian Prince Aji Caka introduces the Sanskrit language and Pallawa script, used to inscribe Javanese words and phrases, to the Indonesian islands.
- Emperor Kadphises of the Kushan Empire sends a delegation to Rome, to seek support against the Parthians.
- This is the base year (year zero) of the Shaka era used by some Hindu calendars, the Indian national calendar, and the Cambodian Buddhist calendar. It begins near the vernal equinox for the civil solar calendar, but begins opposite the star Spica for the traditional solar calendar.
- Pacorus II becomes king of the Parthian Empire (r. 78–115).

=== By topic ===
==== Philosophy ====
- The Chinese philosopher Wang Chong (Wang-Ch'ung) claims all phenomena have material causes.

== Births ==
- Liu Qing, Chinese prince of the Han dynasty (d. 106)
- Wang Fu, Chinese historian, poet and philosopher (approximate date)
- Zhang Heng, Chinese mathematician, astronomer, inventor, and statesman (d. 139)

== Deaths ==
- Gaius Salonius Matidius Patruinus, Roman politician
- Vologases I, king of the Parthian Empire
