= Dog (zodiac) =

Sign of Chinese zodiac

- "Dog" in regular Chinese characters
- Chinese: 狗
Transcriptions
Standard Mandarin
- Hanyu Pinyin: gǒu
- Wade–Giles: kou^{3}
- IPA: [kòʊ]
Yue: Cantonese
- Yale Romanization: gáu
- Jyutping: gau2
- IPA: [kɐw˧˥]
Southern Min
- Hokkien POJ: kó͘ / kió / káu
Eastern Min
- Fuzhou BUC: gēu
Northern Min
- Jian'ou Romanized: gě / ě
Old Chinese
- Baxter–Sagart (2014): *Cə.kˤroʔ

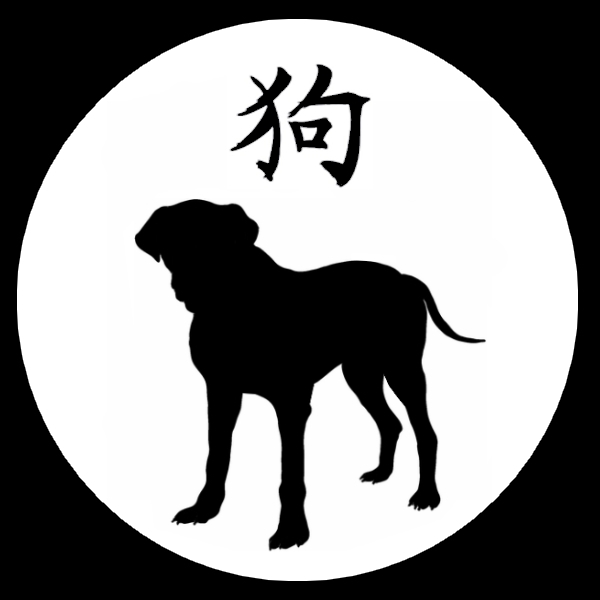
Zodiac dog, showing the gǒu (狗) character for dog

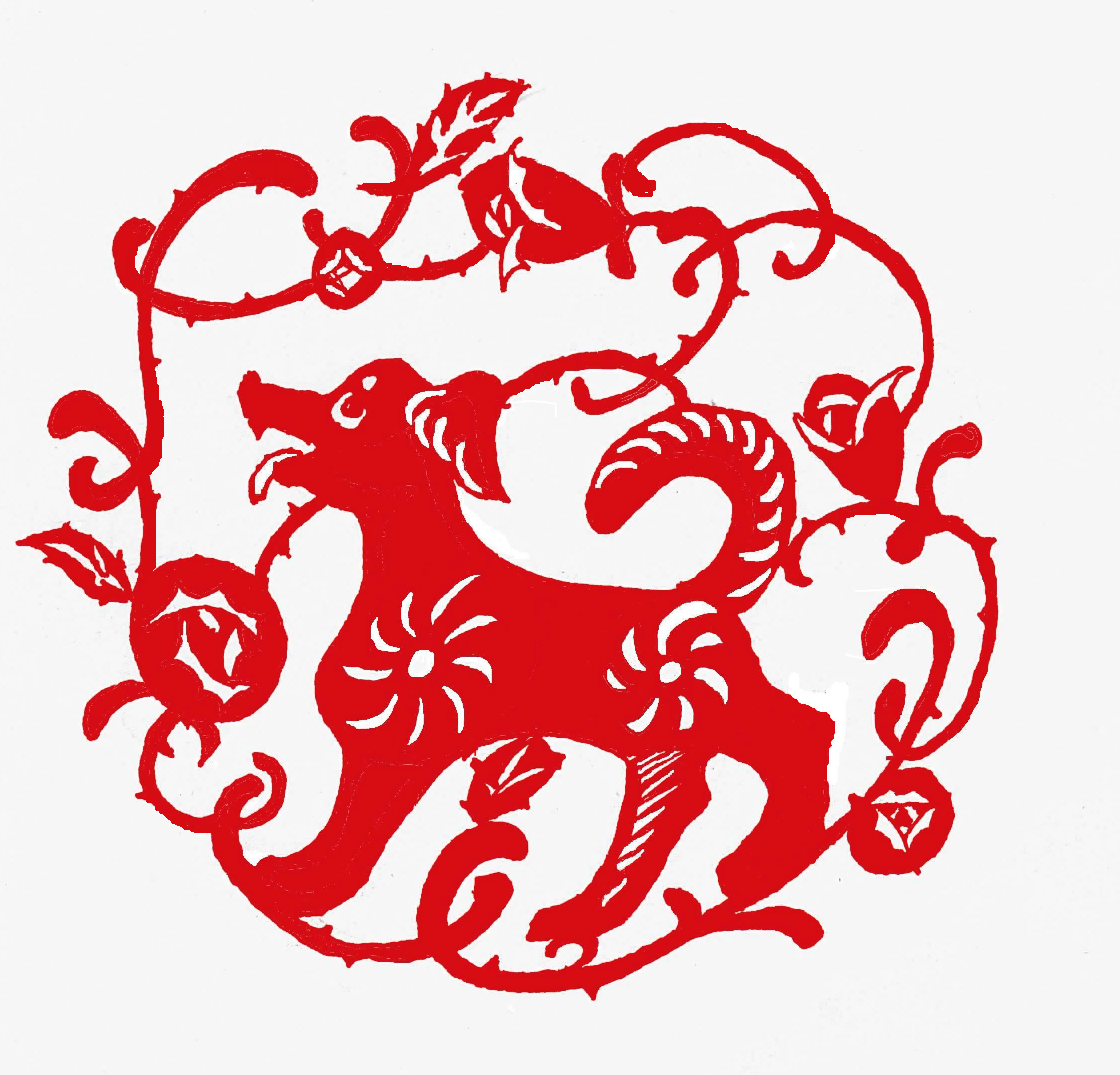
Chinese paper cutting

The Dog (狗) is eleventh of the 12-year cycle of animals which appear in the Chinese zodiac related to the Chinese calendar. The Year of the Dog is associated with the Earthly Branch symbol 戌. The character 狗 also refers to the actual animal while 戌, also refers to the zodiac animal.

== Years and the Five Elements ==
People born within these date ranges can be said to have been born in the "Year of the Dog", while also bearing the following elemental sign:

Sexagenary cycle years

Start date	End date	Heavenly branch
10 February 1910	29 January 1911	Metal Dog
28 January 1922	15 February 1923	Water Dog
14 February 1934	3 February 1935	Wood Dog
2 February 1946	21 January 1947	Fire Dog
18 February 1958	7 February 1959	Earth Dog
6 February 1970	26 January 1971	Metal Dog
25 January 1982	12 February 1983	Water Dog
10 February 1994	30 January 1995	Wood Dog
29 January 2006	17 February 2007	Fire Dog
16 February 2018	4 February 2019	Earth Dog
3 February 2030	22 January 2031	Metal Dog
22 January 2042	9 February 2043	Water Dog
8 February 2054	27 January 2055	Wood Dog
26 January 2066	13 February 2067	Fire Dog
12 February 2078	1 February 2079	Earth Dog
30 January 2090	17 February 2091	Metal Dog
17 February 2102	6 February 2103	Water Dog

== Basic astrology elements ==
Earthly Branches of Birth Year:	戌 Xu
The Five Elements:	Earth
Cardinal Point:	West-Northwest (WNW)
Yin/ Yang:	Yang
Lunar Month:	October
Season:	Autumn
Earthly Branch Ruling Hours:	19:00 to 20:59
Twelve Heavenly Generals:	Sanskrit: Vajra (Hanzi: 伐折羅)
Lucky Flowers:	Rose, cymbidium, orchid
Lucky Numbers:	3, 4, 9; Avoid: 1, 6, 7
Lucky Colors:	Beige, pink, yellow; Avoid: blue, white, black
Lucky/Associated Countries:	New Zealand, Ireland, Australia, Belgium, Paraguay, Nigeria

== 2018 ==
In the sexagenary cycle, 2018 (16 February 2018 – 4 February 2019, and every 60-year multiple before and after), is the Celestial stem/Earthly Branch year indicated by the characters 戊戌. For the 2018 Year of the Dog, many countries and regions issued lunar new year stamps. These included countries where the holiday is traditionally observed as well as countries in the Americas, Europe and Oceania.

== See also ==
- Dog
- Dog in Chinese mythology
- Animal worship
