= Polycarpus II of Byzantium =

Bishop of Byzantium from 141 to 144

- Bishop of Byzantium
- Installed: c. 141
- Term ended: c. 144
- Predecessor: Felix of Byzantium
- Successor: Athenodorus of Byzantium

Personal details
- Died: c. 144
- Denomination: Early Christianity

Polycarpus II of Byzantium (Greek: Πολύκαρπος Βʹ; died c. 144) was the bishop of Byzantium from around 141 until his death in 144. According to ancient sources, he remained in office for seventeen years, but Church historian Nikiforos Kallistos mentions that Polycarpus II was the bishop of Byzantium for three years (141 – 144). He succeeded bishop Felix of Byzantium, and his successor was Athenodorus of Byzantium.

== Notes and references ==
Titles of the Great Christian Church
Preceded by Felix	Bishop of Byzantium; 141 – 144	Succeeded by Athenodorus
