= 139 Mcurn earthquake =

Earthquake that affected the city of Mcurn (modern Hösnek, Turkey)

Coordinates: 38.999°N 39.400°E

The 139 Mcurn earthquake is listed in bibliographical records of seismology as having affected the city of Mcurn (modern Hösnek, Turkey).

The earthquake reportedly took place in the vicinity of Mount Ararat. The region was part of the historic Kingdom of Armenia, corresponding to eastern areas of modern Turkey. A primary source for the earthquake is the work of the historian Movses Khorenatsi (5th century).

Khorenatsi reported that the city of Mcbin-Nisibis (modern Nusaybin) was reconstructed by Sanatruk, following the city's destruction by an earthquake. It is unclear whether this Sanatruk was a king of Armenia or a Parthian invader. According to Khorenatsi's narrative, Sanatruk demolished the ruins of Nisibis and then rebuilt the city. The new city was reportedly more magnificent than its predecessor, fortified with a double defensive wall and an outwork.

The location of the earthquake is unclear. Mcbin was the Armenian name for Nisibis. But Nisibis was traditionally located in Mesopotamia, not in Armenia. The historian Sebeos (7th century) mentions a palace of Sanatruk, which was located in Nisibis. Sebeos drew information from earlier sources, and his narrative may have been influenced by Khorenatsi.

The historian Faustus of Byzantium (4th–5th century) reports that Sanatruk reconstructed the city of Mcurn, and not that of Mcbin. Mcurn was an Armenian city, located near the river Euphrates. Its exact site is unidentified. The difference concerning the identity of the reconstructed city may be based on a spelling mistake. Mcbin's name was also spelled as "Mcuin", closer to the name of Mcurn.

The Armenian historians drew information from ancient legends and oral traditions, placing doubt on the reported date and location of the earthquake. The traditional date of this earthquake is the year 139, but it may have instead occurred in earlier or later years of the 2nd century, since Sanatruk died around 110.

== Sources ==
- Guidoboni, Emanuela; Traina, Giusto (1995), "A new catalogue of earthquakes in the historical Armenian area from antiquity to the 12th century", Annals of Geophysics, 38, doi:10.4401/ag-4134
