= AD 146 =

146 in various calendars
- Gregorian calendar: 146; CXLVI
- Ab urbe condita: 899
- Assyrian calendar: 4896
- Balinese saka calendar: 67–68
- Bengali calendar: −448 – −447
- Berber calendar: 1096
- Buddhist calendar: 690
- Burmese calendar: −492
- Byzantine calendar: 5654–5655
- Chinese calendar: 乙酉年 (Wood Rooster); 2843 or 2636 — to — 丙戌年 (Fire Dog); 2844 or 2637
- Coptic calendar: −138 – −137
- Discordian calendar: 1312
- Ethiopian calendar: 138–139
- Hebrew calendar: 3906–3907
- Hindu calendars
- Vikram Samvat: 202–203
- Shaka Samvat: 67–68
- Kali Yuga: 3246–3247
- Holocene calendar: 10146
- Iranian calendar: 476 BP – 475 BP
- Islamic calendar: 491 BH – 490 BH
- Javanese calendar: 21–22
- Julian calendar: 146; CXLVI
- Korean calendar: 2479
- Minguo calendar: 1766 before ROC 民前1766年
- Nanakshahi calendar: −1322
- Seleucid era: 457/458 AG
- Thai solar calendar: 688–689
- Tibetan calendar: ཤིང་མོ་བྱ་ལོ་ (female Wood-Bird); 272 or −109 or −881 — to — མེ་ཕོ་ཁྱི་ལོ་ (male Fire-Dog); 273 or −108 or −880

Year 146 (CXLVI) was a common year starting on Friday of the Julian calendar. At the time, it was known as the Year of the Consulship of Clarus and Severus (or, less frequently, year 899 Ab urbe condita). The denomination 146 for this year has been used since the early medieval period, when the Anno Domini calendar era became the prevalent method in Europe for naming years.

== Events ==
=== By place ===
==== Roman Empire ====
- Faustina the Younger is given the title Augusta, and becomes Roman Empress.
- Marcus Aurelius receives the imperium proconsular.

==== Asia ====
- Change of era name from Yongxi (1st year) to Benchu era of the Chinese Han dynasty.
- Han Huandi succeeds Han Zhidi as emperor of the Chinese Han dynasty.
- Chadae becomes ruler of the Korean kingdom of Goguryeo.

== Births ==
- Guo Si (or Guo Duo), Chinese general (d. 197)

== Deaths ==
- Han Zhidi, Chinese emperor of the Han dynasty (b. 138)
- Sextus Erucius Clarus, Roman politician
