= AD 137 =

137 in various calendars
- Gregorian calendar: 137; CXXXVII
- Ab urbe condita: 890
- Assyrian calendar: 4887
- Balinese saka calendar: 58–59
- Bengali calendar: −457 – −456
- Berber calendar: 1087
- Buddhist calendar: 681
- Burmese calendar: −501
- Byzantine calendar: 5645–5646
- Chinese calendar: 丙子年 (Fire Rat); 2834 or 2627 — to — 丁丑年 (Fire Ox); 2835 or 2628
- Coptic calendar: −147 – −146
- Discordian calendar: 1303
- Ethiopian calendar: 129–130
- Hebrew calendar: 3897–3898
- Hindu calendars
- Vikram Samvat: 193–194
- Shaka Samvat: 58–59
- Kali Yuga: 3237–3238
- Holocene calendar: 10137
- Iranian calendar: 485 BP – 484 BP
- Islamic calendar: 500 BH – 499 BH
- Javanese calendar: 12–13
- Julian calendar: 137; CXXXVII
- Korean calendar: 2470
- Minguo calendar: 1775 before ROC 民前1775年
- Nanakshahi calendar: −1331
- Seleucid era: 448/449 AG
- Thai solar calendar: 679–680
- Tibetan calendar: མེ་ཕོ་བྱི་བ་ལོ་ (male Fire-Rat); 263 or −118 or −890 — to — མེ་མོ་གླང་ལོ་ (female Fire-Ox); 264 or −117 or −889

Year 137 (CXXXVII) was a common year starting on Monday of the Julian calendar. At the time, it was known as the Year of the Consulship of Caesar and Balbinus (or, less frequently, year 890 Ab urbe condita). The denomination 137 for this year has been used since the early medieval period, when the Anno Domini calendar era became the prevalent method in Europe for naming years.

== Events ==
=== By place ===
==== Roman Empire ====
- Tax laws are passed for trade in Palmyra. The caravan city grows rich by importing rare products from the Persian Gulf, and by exporting items manufactured by the Mediterranean world to the East.

==== Asia ====
- In Jiaozhi (present-day northern Vietnam) during the Second Era of Northern Domination, a rebellion of the Cham people broke out and lasted for one year, until the peace agreement was made between the Han dynasty governors and the rebels in 138.

== Births ==
- Didius Julianus, Roman emperor (according to Historia Augusta) (d. 193)
- Shi Xie, Chinese official, ruler of Jiaozhi (d. 226)
- Wang Yun, Chinese official, politician (d. 192)

== Deaths ==
- Telesphorus of Rome
