= AD 182 =

182 in various calendars
- Gregorian calendar: 182; CLXXXII
- Ab urbe condita: 935
- Assyrian calendar: 4932
- Balinese saka calendar: 103–104
- Bengali calendar: −412 – −411
- Berber calendar: 1132
- Buddhist calendar: 726
- Burmese calendar: −456
- Byzantine calendar: 5690–5691
- Chinese calendar: 辛酉年 (Metal Rooster); 2879 or 2672 — to — 壬戌年 (Water Dog); 2880 or 2673
- Coptic calendar: −102 – −101
- Discordian calendar: 1348
- Ethiopian calendar: 174–175
- Hebrew calendar: 3942–3943
- Hindu calendars
- Vikram Samvat: 238–239
- Shaka Samvat: 103–104
- Kali Yuga: 3282–3283
- Holocene calendar: 10182
- Iranian calendar: 440 BP – 439 BP
- Islamic calendar: 454 BH – 453 BH
- Javanese calendar: 58–59
- Julian calendar: 182; CLXXXII
- Korean calendar: 2515
- Minguo calendar: 1730 before ROC 民前1730年
- Nanakshahi calendar: −1286
- Seleucid era: 493/494 AG
- Thai solar calendar: 724–725
- Tibetan calendar: ལྕགས་མོ་བྱ་ལོ་ (female Iron-Bird); 308 or −73 or −845 — to — ཆུ་ཕོ་ཁྱི་ལོ་ (male Water-Dog); 309 or −72 or −844

Year 182 (CLXXXII) was a common year starting on Monday of the Julian calendar. At the time, it was known as the Year of the Consulship of Sura and Rufus (or, less frequently, year 935 Ab urbe condita). The denomination 182 for this year has been used since the early medieval period, when the Anno Domini calendar era became the prevalent method in Europe for naming years.

== Events ==
=== By place ===
==== Roman Empire ====
- Emperor Commodus escapes death at the hands of assassins, who have attacked him at the instigation of his sister Lucilla and a large group of senators. He puts many distinguished Romans to death on charges of being implicated in the conspiracy; Lucilla is exiled to Capri.

== Births ==
- July 5 – Sun Quan, Chinese emperor of the Eastern Wu state (d. 252)
- Zhu Ran, Chinese general of the Eastern Wu state (d. 249)

== Deaths ==
- Lucilla, Roman empress and daughter of Marcus Aurelius
- Marcus Ummidius Quadratus, Roman politician (b. 138)
- Saoterus, Bithynian Greek freedman and chamberlain
- Ummidia Cornificia Faustina, Roman noblewoman (b. 141)
