= Earth Ox =

26th combination of the sexagenary cycle

Chinese name
- Chinese: 己丑
Transcriptions
Standard Mandarin
- Hanyu Pinyin: jǐchǒu

Vietnamese name
- Vietnamese alphabet: Kỷ Sửu
- Chữ Hán: 己丑

South Korean name
- Hangul: 기축
- Hanja: 己丑
Transcriptions
- Revised Romanization: gichuk

Japanese name
- Kanji: 己丑
- Kana: つちのとうし きちゅう
Transcriptions
- Romanization: tsuchinotoushi kichū

Sexagenary cycle
| 01; Wood Rat | 02; Wood Ox | 03; Fire Tiger | 04; Fire Rabbit | 05; Earth Dragon | 06; Earth Snake |
| 07; Metal Horse | 08; Metal Goat | 09; Water Monkey | 10; Water Rooster | 11; Wood Dog | 12; Wood Pig |
| 13; Fire Rat | 14; Fire Ox | 15; Earth Tiger | 16; Earth Rabbit | 17; Metal Dragon | 18; Metal Snake |
| 19; Water Horse | 20; Water Goat | 21; Wood Monkey | 22; Wood Rooster | 23; Fire Dog | 24; Fire Pig |
| 25; Earth Rat | 26; Earth Ox | 27; Metal Tiger | 28; Metal Rabbit | 29; Water Dragon | 30; Water Snake |
| 31; Wood Horse | 32; Wood Goat | 33; Fire Monkey | 34; Fire Rooster | 35; Earth Dog | 36; Earth Pig |
| 37; Metal Rat | 38; Metal Ox | 39; Water Tiger | 40; Water Rabbit | 41; Wood Dragon | 42; Wood Snake |
| 43; Fire Horse | 44; Fire Goat | 45; Earth Monkey | 46; Earth Rooster | 47; Metal Dog | 48; Metal Pig |
| 49; Water Rat | 50; Water Ox | 51; Wood Tiger | 52; Wood Rabbit | 53; Fire Dragon | 54; Fire Snake |
| 55; Earth Horse | 56; Earth Goat | 57; Metal Monkey | 58; Metal Rooster | 59; Water Dog | 60; Water Pig |

Heavenly Stems ・ Earthly Branches

Earth Ox (Chinese: 己丑; pinyin: jǐchǒu) is the 26th combination of the sexagenary cycle of the Chinese zodiac. It is preceded by Earth Rat and followed by Metal Tiger. In the traditional correspondence of the Heavenly Stems with the Five Phases, jǐ (己) represents yin and Earth, while the Earthly Branch chǒu (丑) corresponds to the Ox zodiac.

== Earth Ox years ==
A year of the Earth Ox occurs every 60 years according to the following table:

| 1st millennium | 2nd millennium | 3rd millennium | 4th millennium |
|---|---|---|---|
| 29; 89; 149; 209; 269; 329; 389; 449; 509; 569; 629; 689; 749; 809; 869; 929; 989 | 1049; 1109; 1169; 1229; 1289; 1349; 1409; 1469; 1529; 1589; 1649; 1709; 1769; 1829; 1889; 1949 | 2009; 2069; 2129; 2189; 2249; 2309; 2369; 2429; 2489; 2549; 2609; 2669; 2729; 2789; 2849; 2909; 2969 | 3029; 3089; 3149; 3209; 3269; 3329; 3389; 3449; 3509; 3569; 3629; 3689; 3749; 3809; 3869; 3929; 3989 |

== Earth Ox months ==
When months are numbered using the sexagenary cycle, the twelfth month of a year whose heavenly stem is 乙 (yǐ) or 庚 (gēng) is a Earth Ox month.

== Earth Ox days ==
A Earth Ox day occurs every 60 days according to the following table:

| 2023 | 2024 | 2025 | 2026 | 2027 | 2028 | 2029 |
|---|---|---|---|---|---|---|
| 31 January; 1 April; 31 May; 30 July; 28 September; 27 November | 26 January; 26 March; 25 May; 24 July; 22 September; 21 November | 20 January; 21 March; 20 May; 19 July; 17 September; 16 November | 15 January; 16 March; 15 May; 14 July; 12 September; 11 November | 10 January; 11 March; 10 May; 9 July; 7 September; 6 November | 5 January; 5 March; 4 May; 3 July; 1 September; 31 October; 30 December | 28 February; 29 April; 28 June; 27 August; 26 October; 25 December |
