= Eleutherius of Byzantium =

Bishop of Byzantium from 129 to 136

- Bishop of Byzantium
- Installed: 129
- Term ended: 136
- Predecessor: Diogenes of Byzantium
- Successor: Felix of Byzantium

Personal details
- Died: 136
- Denomination: Early Christianity

Eleutherius of Bizantium (Greek: Ἐλευθέριος; died 136) was the bishop of Byzantium for approximately seven years (129 – 136). He succeeded bishop Diogenes of Byzantium. He was in office during the rule of Roman emperor Hadrian. His successor was Felix of Byzantium.

== Notes and references ==
Titles of the Great Christian Church
Preceded by Diogenes	Bishop of Byzantium; 129 – 136	Succeeded by Felix
