= Cyriacus of Jerusalem =

Saint Cyriacus of Jerusalem
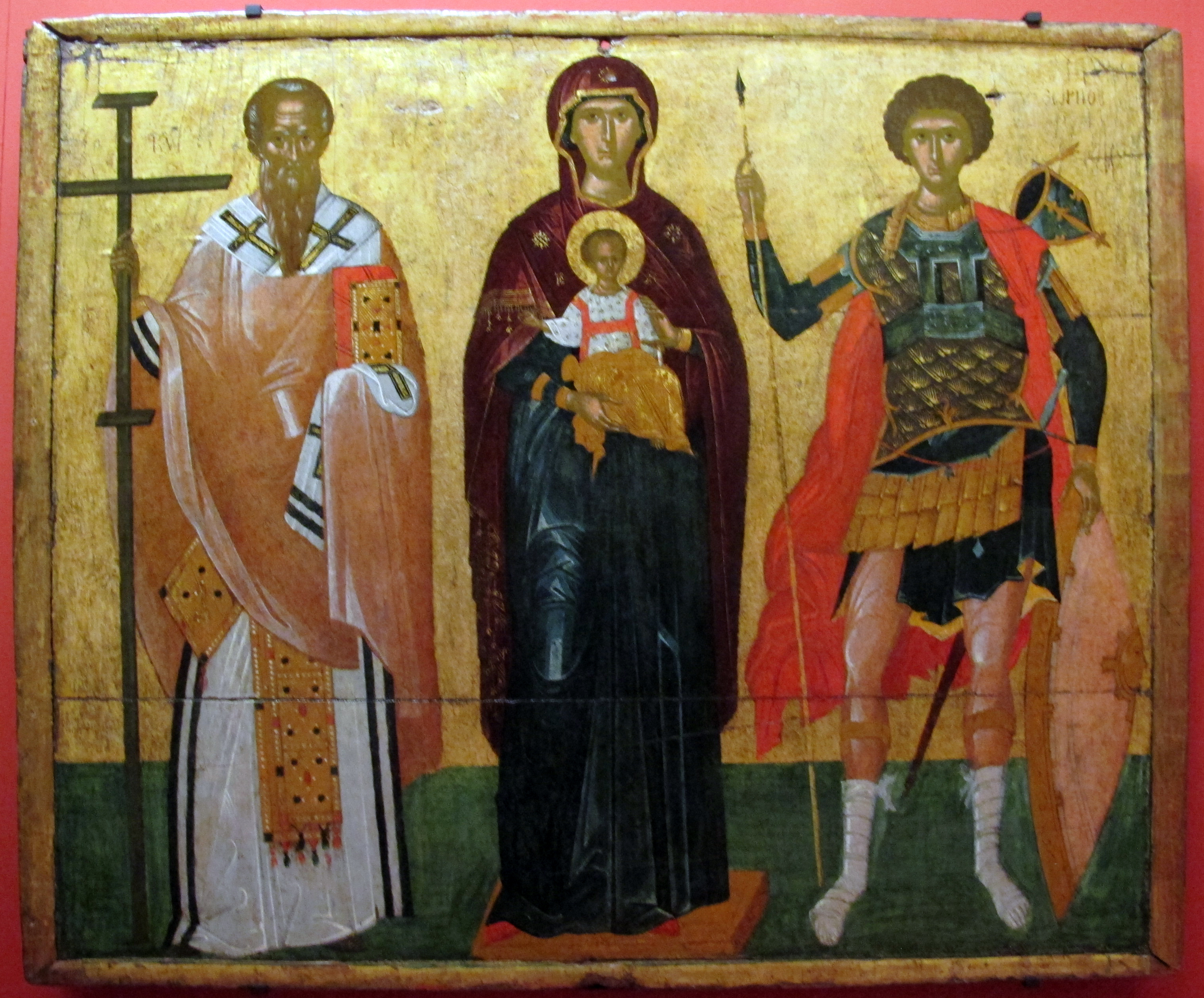
- Died: ~133 AD

Cyriacus of Jerusalem (also called Judas Cyriacus; died 133) was a bishop of Jerusalem who died during a riot in 133 AD. He is often misidentified with Cyriacus of Ancona (d. 360).
