= Felix of Byzantium =

Bishop of Byzantium from 136 to 141

- Bishop of Byzantium
- Installed: 136
- Term ended: 141
- Predecessor: Eleutherius of Byzantium
- Successor: Polycarpus II of Byzantium

Personal details
- Died: 141
- Denomination: Early Christianity

Felix of Byzantium (Greek: Φῆλιξ; died 141) was the bishop of Byzantium for five years (136 – 141). He succeeded bishop Eleutherius of Byzantium. He was in office during the rule of Roman emperors Hadrian and Antoninus Pius. His successor was Polycarpus II of Byzantium.

== Notes and references ==
Titles of the Great Christian Church
Preceded by Eleutherius	Bishop of Byzantium; 136 – 141	Succeeded by Polycarpus II
