= Tollense valley battlefield =

Bronze Age battle in northern Germany

Battle of the Tollense Valley
- Part of Late Bronze Age collapse
Date	c. 1300-1200 BC
Location	Tollense Valley, present-day Germany 53.7625°N 13.3080°E
Result	Unknown

Belligerents
Local Bronze Age culture, potentially associated with the Nordic Bronze Age or Urnfield culture	Migrants from the east, possibly associated with the Lusatian culture or other contemporary cultures in central or eastern Europe
- One of the oldest known battles fought in Europe
- Location within Mecklenburg-Vorpommern

Location of the site in Germany

The battlefield of the Tollense valley (German pronunciation: [tʰɔˈlɛnzə]) is a Bronze Age archaeological site in the northern German state of Mecklenburg-Vorpommern at the northern edge of the Mecklenburg Lake District. The site, discovered in 1996 and systematically excavated since 2007, extends along the valley of the small Tollense river, to the east of Weltzin village, on the municipal territories of Burow and Werder. As of late 2024, excavation was ongoing.

Thousands of bone fragments belonging to many people have been discovered, along with further corroborative evidence of battle; current estimates indicate that perhaps 4,000 warriors from Central and Northern Europe fought in a battle on the site in the 13th century BC. As the population density was approximately 5 people per square kilometer (13 people per square mile), this would have been the most significant battle in Bronze Age Central Europe known so far, making the Tollense valley the largest excavated and archaeologically verifiable battle site of this age in the world.

== Discovery and excavation ==
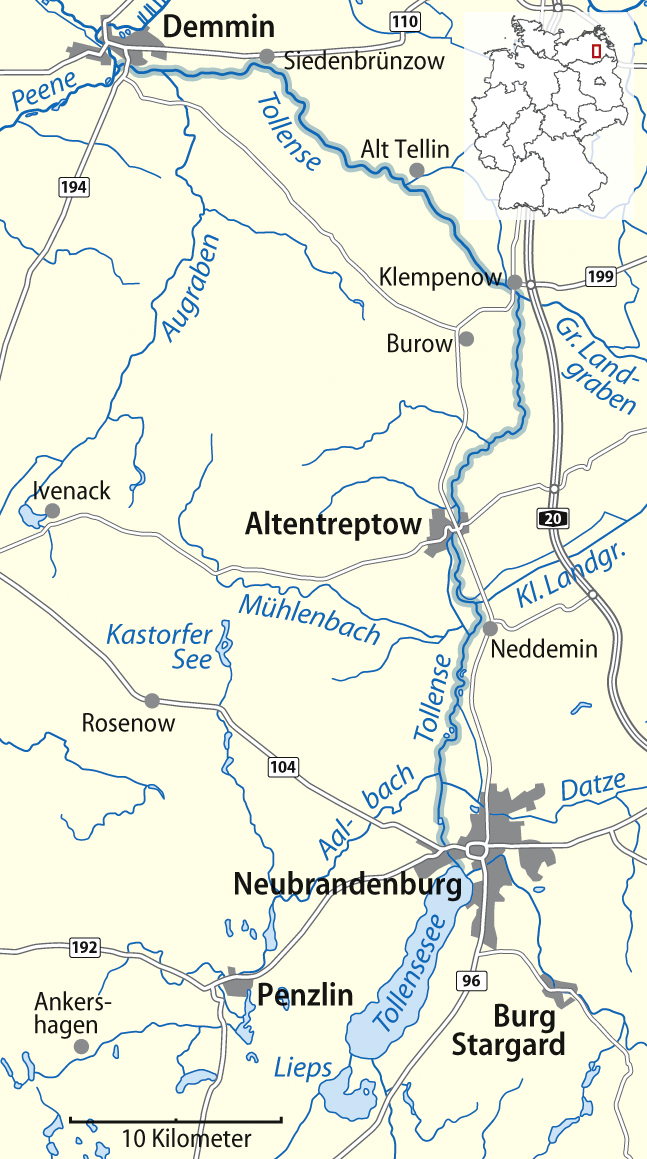
The Tollense valley. The find site is near Burow, in the upper half.

In 1996, a volunteer conservationist reported finding a humerus bone at the Tollense riverside at low water with an embedded arrowhead made of flint. Preliminary archaeological excavations began the same year around this site and further human and animal bones were found. During the following years, a club made of ashwood was discovered as well as a hammer-like weapon made of sloe-wood and more bones.

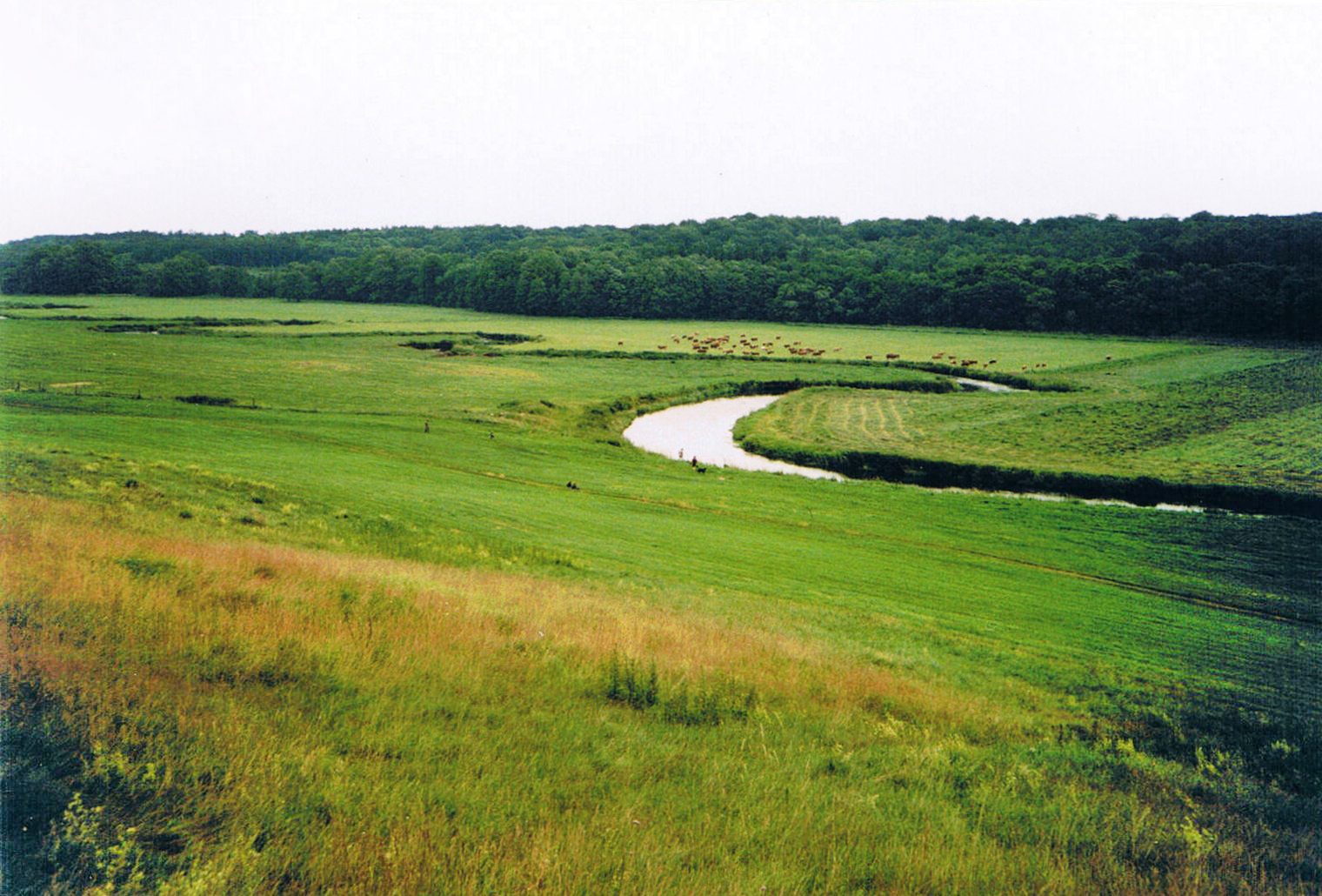
The Tollense near Burow today

Since 2007, the area has been excavated systematically under the direction of the local State Office for Culture and Conservation, the State Office for Conservation of neighbouring Lower Saxony, and the University of Greifswald. Divers of the local Society for Underwater Archaeology carefully searched the Tollense riverbed and -bank and found more human remains. Since 2009, the MV Ministry of Culture has supported research in the area and on the findings, joined since 2010 by the Deutsche Forschungsgemeinschaft.

The primary focus is on exploring the extent of the site and excavating the main site covered by about 1 m (3.3 ft) of peat. As of late 2017, 460 m^{2} (5,000 sq ft) had been excavated, but the entire battlefield is estimated to be at least ten times that size. Volunteers have surveyed the grounds with metal detectors, investigating mainly the dug-out material from the Tollense.

Greifswald's Department of Geography examined the geological make-up of the valley and determined the river's former course, and laser scanning was used to chart the terrain surface. The human remains were analysed at Rostock University.

== Site ==
Situated in the North German plain, 140 km (87 mi) north of Berlin, the site stretches for several hundred meters on both sides of the small Tollense river. Within the plain, the river meanders in a wide valley between marshy meadows and low hills. During the last millennia, the river's course has been only slightly modified.

In the Bronze Age, the landscape of this area was relatively open. Human influence was small as the population density at that time is estimated to have been only 3 to 5 people per km^{2}. The area was devoid of towns or even small villages. Archaeologists believe that the inhabitants lived with their extended families on individual farmsteads and had loose cultural connections with Scandinavia. The closest known large settlement to the site of the battle at the time was more than 350 kilometers away.

"In 2013, geomagnetic surveys revealed evidence of a 120 m (390 ft) long bridge or causeway stretching across the valley. Excavated over two dig seasons, the submerged structure turned out to be made of wooden posts and stone. Radiocarbon dating showed that although much of the structure predated the battle by more than 500 years, parts of it may have been built or restored around the time of the battle, suggesting the causeway might have been in continuous use for centuries—a well-known landmark."

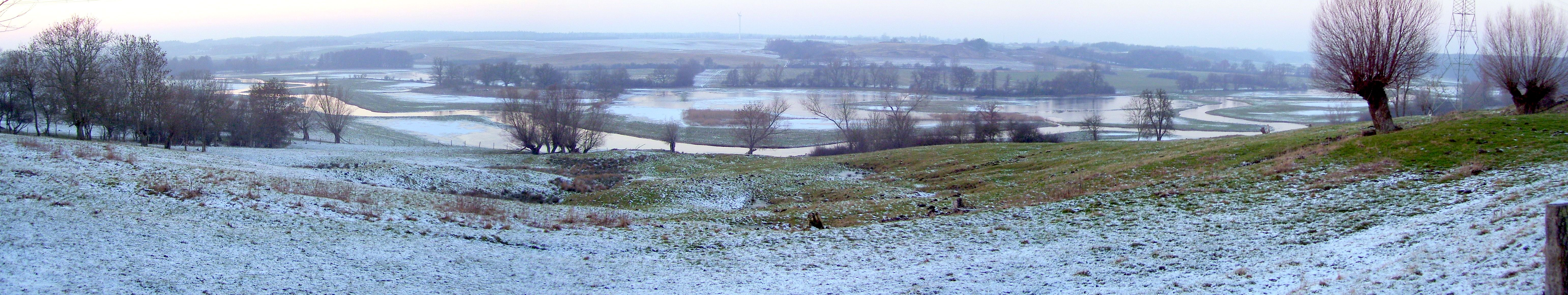
The valley of the Tollense during winter floods, close to Kessin and Weltzin

== Results ==
As of late 2017, the remains of some 140 people had been identified. Most of these were young men between the ages of 20 and 40. There were also at least two women identified among 14 skeletons that were genetically tested. Before March 2016, about 10,000 human and 1,000 animal bones had been found. By March 2018, that number had risen to a total of about 13,000 fragments. The total number of dead is estimated between 750, to more than 1,000. The total number of fighters might have ranged between 3,000 and more than 5,000, assuming a fatality rate of 20-25%.

In one spot, 1,478 bones were found within just 12 m^{2} (130 sq ft), potentially the remnants of a pile of corpses or a final pocket of resistance. Radiocarbon dating indicates a timeframe between 1300 and 1200 BC, the Nordic Bronze Age. As no clear traces of healing have been found on any of the wounds, the whole encounter seems to have taken place in not much more than a day. A quarter of skeletons "show signs of healed traumas from earlier fights, including three skulls with healed fractures", so many trained and experienced warriors seem to have taken part.

Patterns and locations of bone injuries as found with the Tollense valley dead. Legend: Blue circle = blunt force; red star = arrow; blue triangle = piercing; black square = cutting; green lozenge = striking; grey transparent triangle = unspecific.

Initially, alternative explanations were considered, in part because "[b]efore Tollense, direct evidence of large-scale violence in the Bronze Age was scanty, especially in this region". However, the location in a swamp and the lack of any ornaments or pottery made a cemetery unlikely, as local preference at the time was for dry ground burials. The victims were mostly male and between 20 and 40 years of age, killed by a variety of weapons and wounds, therefore mass human sacrifice seemed unlikely.

Spears, clubs, swords, knives, sickles and arrows were used during the battle. Many of the skulls, of which over 40 were found, show signs of battle wounds, with a bronze arrowhead found in one of them. By late 2017, about 50 bronze arrowheads had been found. Remnants of the arrows' wooden shafts provided a further possibility for dating with more than a third dating to the same time as the bones. Contrasting these arrowheads with others made from flint and with wooden clubs, it has been surmised that two differently-equipped groups confronted each other.

No swords have been found so far, but bones show cutting traces typical for this type of weapon. Some combatants rode into battle as evidenced by horse bones, of at least five horses, found on site. The original arrowhead's position in the initially found humerus bone shows that an archer on foot wounded a horseman. Standardized metal weaponry was found intermingled with horse bones. These findings have led archaeologists to conclude that an officer class consisting of bronze-wielding mounted warriors presided over the regular soldiers with simpler weaponry.

The fact that almost no material finds were made between the bones except for single arrowheads, suggests that the corpses were robbed after the battle. Given that most remains are no longer in anatomical connection, the victors probably threw the dead into the river, which carried them downstream. They were then deposited in a calmer part of the river, covered by turf and thereby partially conserved.

In 2010, a golden spiral ring was found on the banks of the Tollense. In June 2011, a similar one was found, 2.9 cm (1.1 in) long and weighing 10 g. The material was identified by X-ray diffraction as tin. These findings are of special importance because of their rarity and because tin was vitally needed for making bronze. These are the oldest known tin items in Germany. The chronologically closest similar find is one from Hallstatt (Austria) – 600 years younger.

A figurine was also discovered which may have been used as weights. Similar figurines have been found in Northern Europe and may have been part of an early Scandinavian weight system, some archaeologists believe.

At first, research on the remains by Aarhus University suggested that the combatants stemmed from two populations. Fighters of one of the groups were thought to have come from a distant region, as they had a diet including millet, which was allegedly not widely known in the North at that time, but this latter claim has been refuted. Palaeogenetic and strontium analyses were used to shed further light on the combatants' geographical origin but revealed no decisive evidence, according to State Archeologist Detlef Jantzen. Research on 14 skeletons in 2020 confirmed they all hailed from Central Europe and were genetically similar. None of those individuals were able to digest milk, although the ability to digest milk, known as lactase persistence and now common in Europe, was hitherto thought to have spread several thousand years earlier.

In 2016, scuba diving archaeologists found what was believed to be the contents of a toolkit belonging to one of the participants at the bottom of the river. A cluster of 31 bronze artifacts was found on the river bed, with the items so close together that it was believed that they had once been in a box or bag which had since rotted away. The contents consisted of a bronze knife with a curved blade, an awl decorated with ladders and rows of triangles, a bronze chisel with wear marks, an assortment of bronze scraps and ingots, and three tubes made of rolled bronze. According to archaeologists, the pieces of scrap bronze would likely have been used as currency in Bronze Age Europe in the absence of coins, and their presence suggested that the owner of the toolkit was not native to the area. Various artifacts found in the box suggested that its owner was from South-Central Europe and had traveled hundreds of kilometres to the battlefield.

It has been speculated that a better-armed group from the South or West wanted to cross the river on their way north- or eastwards on a strategic, long-established causeway. This road might well have been used for long-distance trade in tin and luxury goods (e.g. pearls from the Persian Gulf, found near Halle, or Mediterranean glass pearls found close to nearby Neustrelitz; both from 1200 BC). The battle seems to coincide with a period of heightened militancy 3,250 years ago, as metal became increasingly scarce north of the Alps and populations seem to have moved.

The 2024 study of 54 bronze arrowheads from the valley corroborated the supra-regional nature of the battle. The bronze arrowheads showed a combination of local and foreign forms, suggesting at least one foreign belligerent from southern Central Europe. Outside of the Tollense Valley, bronze arrowheads in large numbers were found only at few Central European sites.

== Significance ==
The overseeing State Archaeologist Detlef Jantzen claims this is the oldest archaeologically verifiable battlefield in Europe and one of the 50 most important find sites worldwide. He also said: "The Tollense site has a dimension that nobody would have deemed possible for our region." The discovery of the battlefield forced archeologists to rethink their views on warfare in the Bronze Age, as evidence of such warfare had been scant prior. Although historical accounts from the Near East and Ancient Greece had described epic battles, archaeological evidence corroborating these accounts had been scant. In regions of Bronze Age Europe where there was a lack of even such accounts, the only pieces of evidence archaeologists had to go by were weapons in ceremonial graves and a handful of mass graves with signs of violence such as decapitations and arrowheads embedded in bones. Archaeologists had previously believed that combat in the Bronze Age was rare and saw the weapons in ceremonial graves as prestige objects or symbols of power rather than war weapons. According to Svend Hansen of the German Archaeological Institute, "for a long time we didn't really believe in war in prehistory". He stated that "we had considered scenarios of raids, with small groups of young men killing and stealing food, but to imagine such a big battle with thousands of people is very surprising." Helle Vandkilde, an archeologist at Aarhus University commented "Most people thought ancient society was peaceful, and that Bronze Age males were concerned with trading and so on ... Very few talked about warfare."

A group of 5,000 combatants implies that they had been gathered, organised, fed, briefed, and led into battle. According to the researchers at the site, this would have been an astounding feat for the time, probably enabled by a central government. This would mean that socio-political development in Central Europe was more advanced and more bellicose than previously assumed, roughly at a time when Egypt and the Hittites concluded their famous peace treaty. "The well-preserved bones and artifacts add detail to this picture of Bronze Age sophistication, pointing to the existence of a trained warrior class and suggesting that people from across Europe joined the bloody fray."

According to archaeologist Kristian Kristiansen, the Tollense battle would have taken place during an era of significant upheaval from the Mediterranean to the Baltic. At around this time, the Mycenean civilization of ancient Greece collapsed, while the Sea Peoples who had devastated the Hittites were defeated in ancient Egypt. The transformation in the Eastern Mediterranean has been labeled the Late Bronze Age Collapse and has received increased scholarly interest in the 21st century with even some non-academic attention to the topic, notably through books like 1177 B.C.: The Year Civilization Collapsed by archeologist Eric H. Cline. Not long after the battle at Tollense valley, the individual scattered farmsteads of northern Europe were replaced by concentrated and heavily fortified settlements.

== See also ==
- Lusatian culture
- Urnfield culture
- Nordic Bronze Age
- Late Bronze Age collapse
- Prehistoric warfare

== Bibliography ==
- Jantzen et al. 2011. A Bronze Age battlefield? Weapons and trauma in the Tollense Valley, north-eastern Germany. Antiquity. 85(328): 417–433. DOI: 10.1017/S0003598X00067843
- Detlef Jantzen, Thomas Terberger: "Gewaltsamer Tod im Tollensetal vor 3200 Jahren" [Violent death in the Tollense Valley 3200 years ago] (2011). In: Archäologie in Deutschland 4, pp. 6–11.
- Thomas Brock (2015): Archäologie des Krieges. Die Schlachtfelder der deutschen Geschichte [Archaeology of War. Battlefields of German History]. Darmstadt: Zabern.
- Schmidt, Beatrix (2017). Blutiges Gold. Macht und Gewalt in der Bronzezeit. Begleitheft zur Sonderausstellung des Landesamtes für Kultur und Denkmalpflege [Bloodstained Gold. Power and Violence in the Bronze Age. Booklet for the Special Exhibition of the State Office for Culture and Conservation]. Schwerin: Landesamt für Kultur und Denkmalpflege Mecklenburg-Vorpommern. In German, but contains a large number of photographs and illustrations.
- Christian Sell (2017): Addressing challenges of ancient DNA sequence data obtained with next generation methods. PhD Mainz University, Anthropology Institute DOI: --- Analyzed 21 skeletal human remains of Tollense battlefield in a thesis re. optimization of results on highly degraded ancient DNA by most recent methods. One of the results: the majority of sampled 21 individuals fall within the variation of contemporary northern central European samples.
