= 13th century BC =

One hundred years, from 1300 BC to 1201 BC

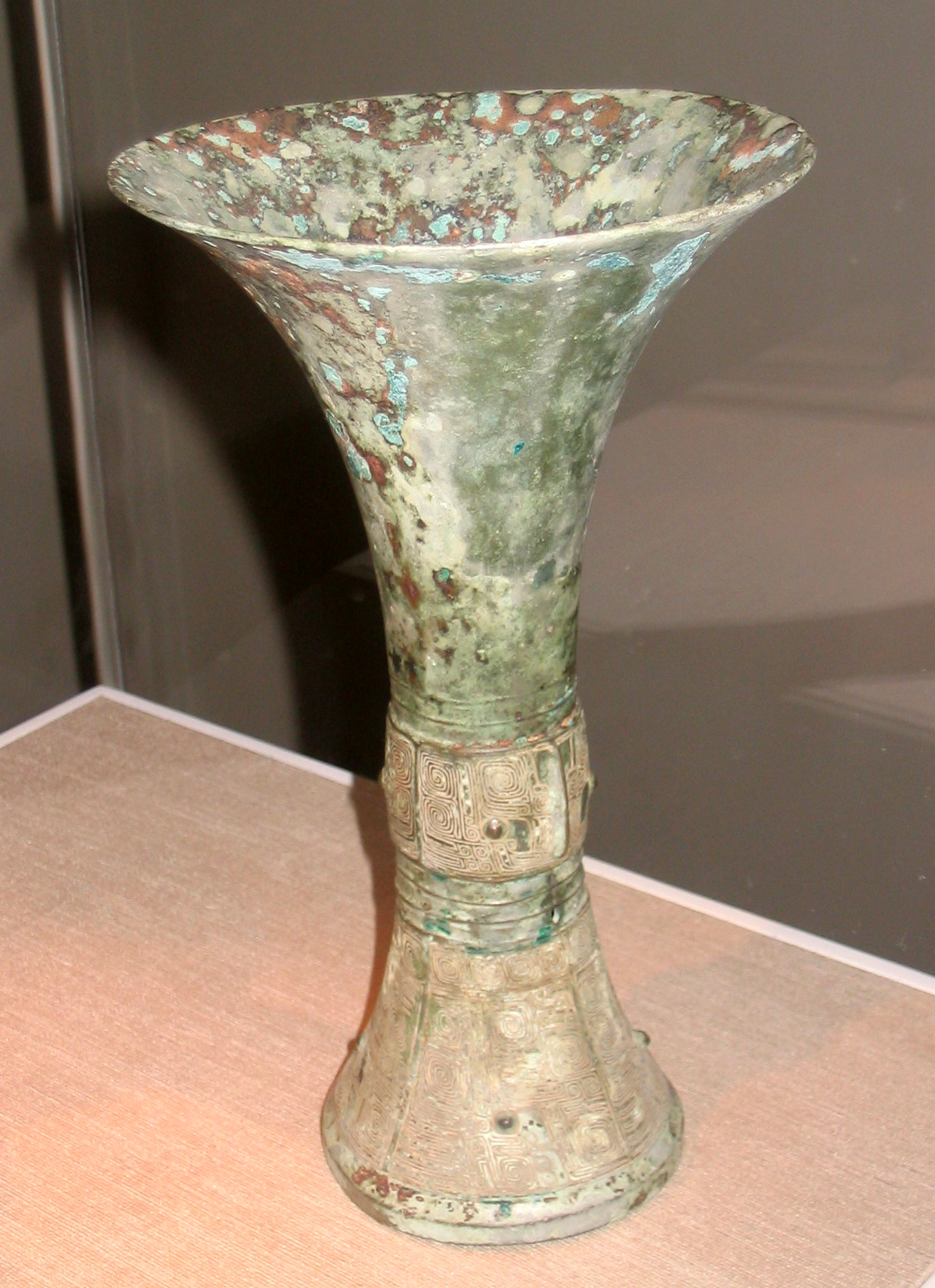
Chinese ritual bronze wine vessel, Shang dynasty, 13th century BC, Arthur M. Sackler Gallery

The 13th century BC was the period from 1300 to 1201 BC.

== The Eastern Hemisphere in the 13th century BC ==
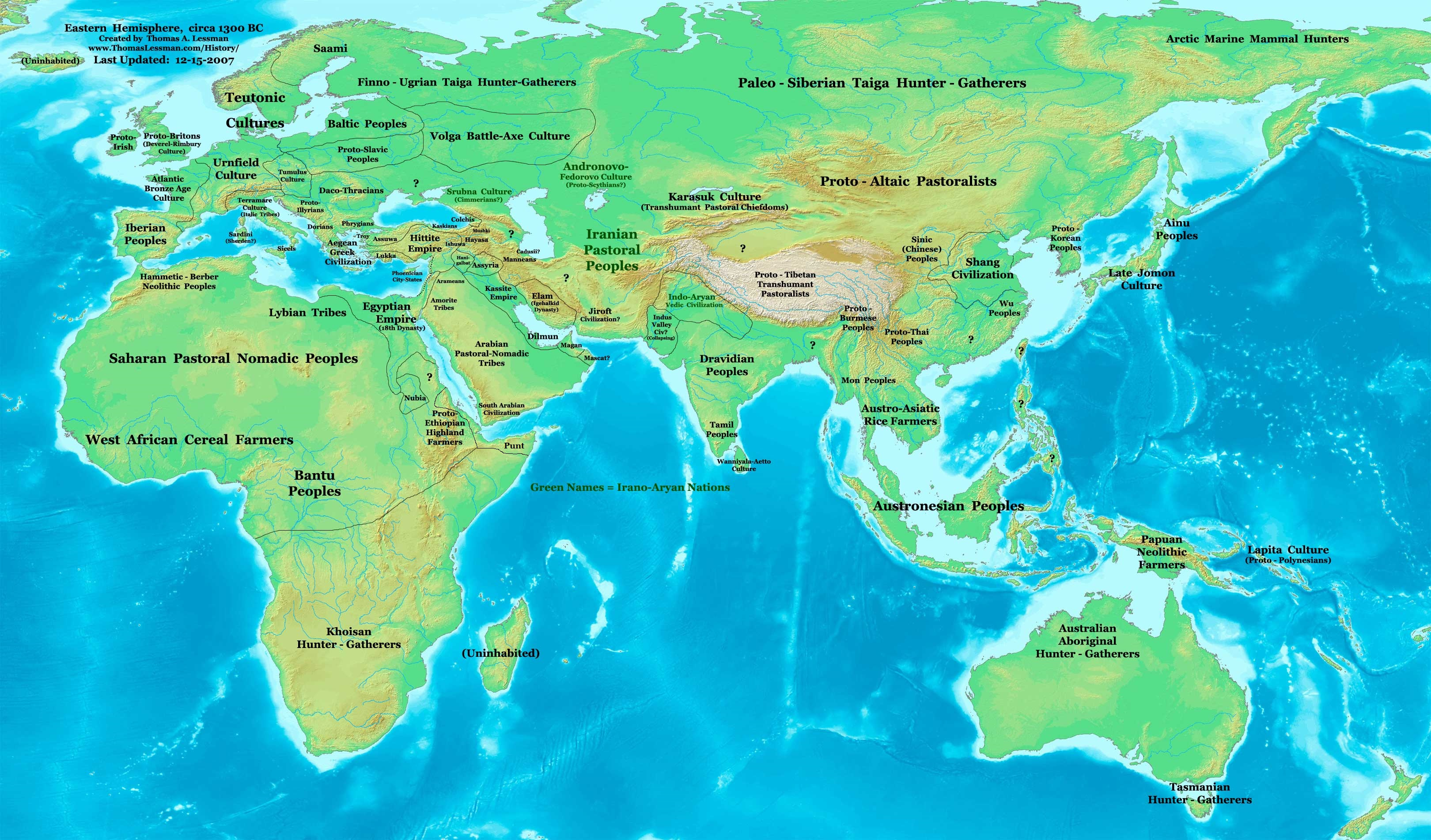
Map of the Eastern Hemisphere in 1300 BC

== Events ==
=== Asia ===
- c. 1300–1046 BC: in China, the Shang dynasty flourishes as it settles its capital, Yin, near Anyang. Chinese settlers swarm in compact groups to create new clearing areas towards the Yangtze basin in the south, the Shanxi terraces in the northwest and the Wei River valley. The Shang then seem to frequently wage war with the still non-Sinicized populations who inhabit the Huai River valley. Graves in the form of cruciform pits have been discovered in Anyang containing chariots with their yokes, numerous bronze vases and the remains of human sacrifices, as well as the first Chinese inscriptions on oracle bones (Jiaguwen) or bronze vases. China's Shang armies are organized into infantry and archers in companies of one hundred men, supporting sections of five chariots.
- c. 1300 BC: the Aryans dominate northwest India as far as the Sarasvati River. The Vedas mention the Dasas (slaves) as their enemies. Dasas are interpreted as being a North Iranian tribe, Dahae. The Aryans are organized in tribal monarchies headed by a raja (king), who shares power with two councils or assemblies that will differentiate over time, the sabhā (court of justice) and the samiti (council of war). Only one raja is named in the Rigveda: Sudas of the Bharatas, a tribe established on the upper reaches of the Sarasvatî. He is described as the victor of the coalition of ten kings, the most powerful of which was Pûru. Subsequently, the Kurus take control of the Bharatas.
- c. 1260 BC: Lapita pottery discovered at the Bourewa site southwest of Viti Levu dates back to this period.

=== Middle East ===
- c. 1350–1210 BC: the Igihalkid dynasty in Elam. They resume the title of "Kings of Anshan and Susa".
- c. 1306–1186 BC: the Nineteenth Dynasty of Egypt. Memphis, then Pi-Ramesses, are the capitals of the New Kingdom of Egypt. It is a period of relative prosperity. During the reign of Ramesses II, the construction of the Great Hypostyle Hall of the temples of Karnak, the Luxor Temple and the temples of Abu Simbel are completed.
- 1307–1275 BC: the first Assyrian mention of the Ahlamu, proto-Aramaic people, during the reign of Adad-nirari I, in the region of the north of the Euphrates. The Aramaeans, a Semitic people reported from the 14th century BC by the archives of Amarna and then Ugarit, settled in North Mesopotamia, then in Aram (now Syria) and Lebanon where they formed kingdoms in the 11th century BC. The biblical tradition of the sons of Jacob, apparently originating from the Aram Naharayim or "Aram of the two rivers", in the loop of the Euphrates, around the towns of Harran and Nahur, seems to confirm that this region was populated by Proto-Aramaic pastors around the 13th century BC.
- 1274 BCE: the Egyptian and Hittite Empires clash in the Battle of Kadesh, with heavy losses to each side but no decisive outcome.
- 1207 BC: Merneptah repels attacks by northern invaders (the "Sea-Peoples") in the 8th year of his reign, according to the Great Karnak Inscription. Eric Cline closely links this event with the beginning of the Late Bronze Age collapse.

=== Europe ===
- c. 1300–1200 BC: Bronze IIIB in Greece. The Lion Gate and the Treasury of Atreus are built in Mycenae. It is a time of peace and prosperity in the Aegean. Mycenaean imports to the Levant peak. A wreck found on the southern coast of Anatolia contained ingots of copper, tin, ivory, Syrian, Cypriot and Mycenaean vases, and pieces of elephant and hippo ivory. The Acropolis of Athens is developed: towards the end of the century, a Cyclopean wall four to six meters thick, known as the “pelasgic wall” (Pelargikon), is constructed, as well as a well to supply the citadel with water. Linear B tablets are created in Pylos.
- c. 1300–1200 BC: approximately 4,000 men fight a battle at a causeway over the Tollense valley in Northern Germany, the largest known prehistoric battle north of the Alps.
- c. 1300–500 BC: the Lusatian culture in Poland, parts of the Czech Republic and Slovakia, eastern Germany and northern Ukraine.
- c. 1250–850 BC: the Urnfield culture, characterized by vast cemeteries housing urns with the ashes of the deceased and offerings, marks the Late Bronze Age in Western Europe.
- c. 1250–1000 BC: the culture of Pantalica develops inland in Sicily.
- 1225–1190 BC: Late Helladic IIIB2 in mainland Greece. The perimeters of the defense systems of the Mycenaean palaces (Mycenae, Tiryns, Midea) are widely extended, a sign that insecurity is increasing. The end of the period was marked by widespread destruction on most sites: Mycenae, Tyrinth, Midéa, Thebes, Orchomenus, Dimini, and Pylos, whose unfortified palaces have not been rebuilt.

== Sovereign states ==
- List of sovereign states in the 13th century BC.
