= Pyla (disambiguation) =

Pyla is a village in Cyprus.

Pyla may also refer to:

- Pyla (moth), a genus of moth

== Places ==
- The Great Dune of Pyla, a sand dune in France
- Pyla-Kokkinokremos, an archaeological site in Cyprus
- Pyla, Ukraine, a settlement in Morshyn urban hromada, Lviv Oblast, Ukraine

== People named Pyla ==
- Pyla Lara Bird-Leakey (born 1998), known as Lara Bird, British politician

== See also ==
- Pylas
