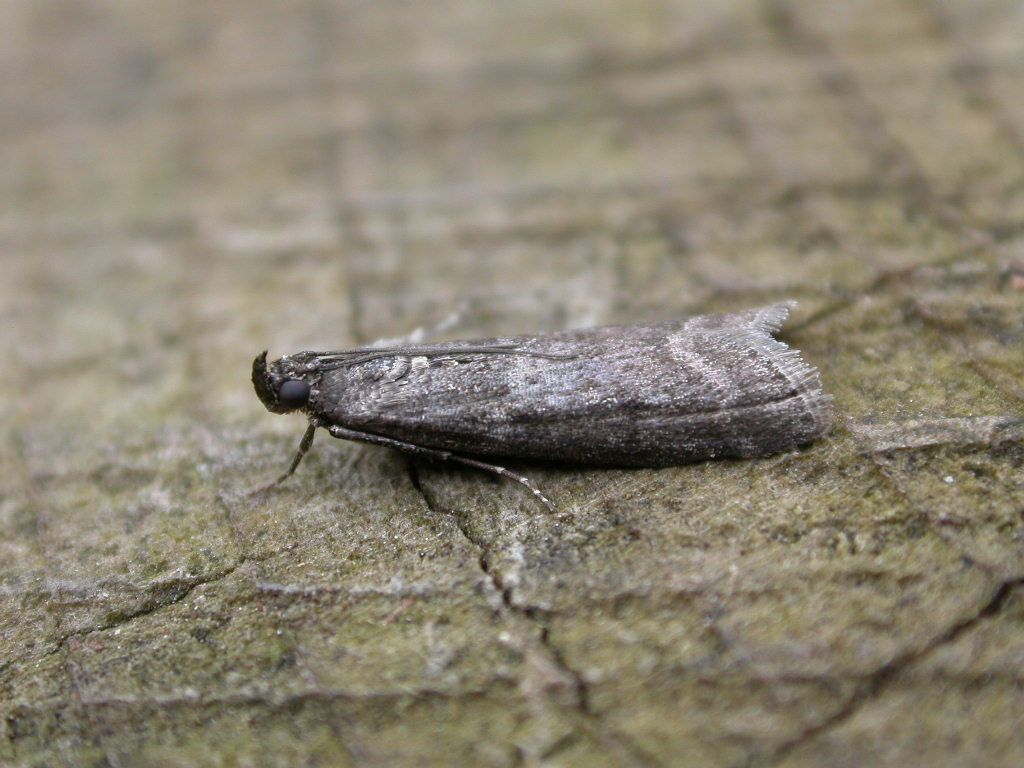

Scientific classification
- Kingdom: Animalia
- Phylum: Arthropoda
- Clade: Pancrustacea
- Class: Insecta
- Order: Lepidoptera
- Family: Pyralidae
- Genus: Pyla
- Species: P. fusca

Binomial name
- Pyla fusca (Haworth, 1811)

Synonyms
- Matilella fusca (Haworth, 1811) (but see text)

= Pyla fusca =

Species of moth

Pyla fusca is a snout moth of the subfamily Phycitinae and inhabits the Holarctic. It is distinct from the other species of the genus Pyla, which are only found in North America, and has been proposed for separation in a monotypic genus Matilella. Considering the insufficient knowledge of Phycitinae, this may be warranted, and eventually relatives of this specimens might be discovered in the Old World, or it might turn out to be a cryptic species complex. On the other hand, its separation might render Pyla paraphyletic, in which case it would not be warranted. More research is required to resolve this question.

The wingspan is 25–28 mm. The forewings are dark fuscous, sprinkled with grey-whitish; first and second lines obscurely pale, darker-edged; two darker transversely placed discal dots. Hindwings fuscous. Larva brown-blackish, incisions brownish; dorsal line black; head and plate of 2 black : on Erica; 7-9. The imago appears to frequent especially those places where the heath has been partly burnt, to which its blackish colouring is adapted.

The moths are on wing from June to August depending on the location. The larvae feed on Erica and Vaccinium species.
