= Maa Palaeokastro =

Late Bronze Age settlement in Cyprus

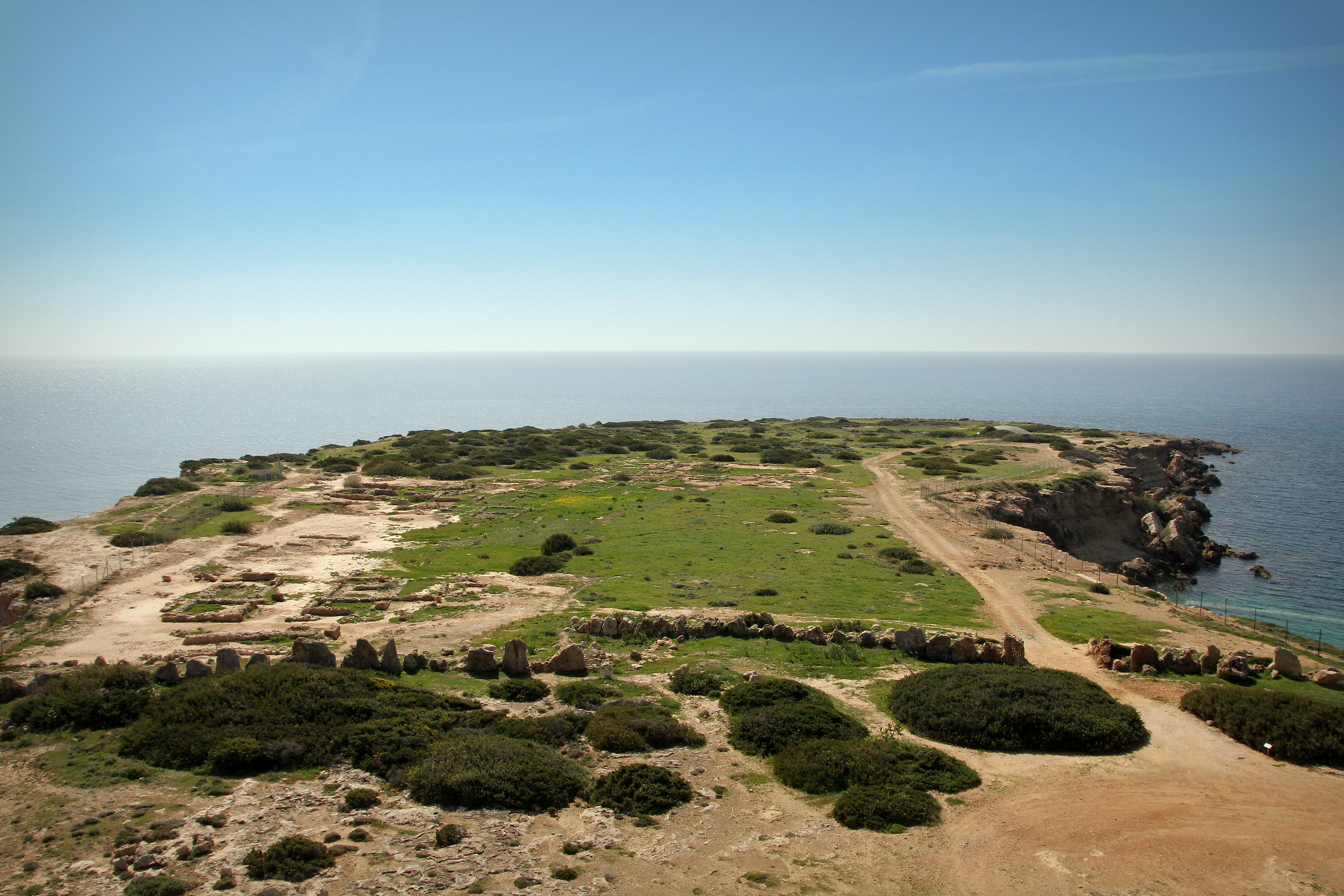
Site

Maa Palaeokastro was a Late Bronze Age settlement in southwest Cyprus, near the modern town of Pegeia. The settlement was occupied by Ancient Greeks from the late 13th century BC to the middle of the 12th century BC. It was located on a peninsula and fortified, suggesting that it had defensive functions. Artifacts found indicate that metal-working and trade took place. The settlement was abandoned as part of the Late Bronze Age collapse after a few generations of habitation.

== See also ==
- Pyla-Kokkinokremos
