= 1177 B.C.: The Year Civilization Collapsed =

2014 book by Eric H. Cline

- Cover of the first edition
- Author: Eric H. Cline
- Audio read by: Andy Caploe
- Language: English
- Series: Turning Points in Ancient History
- Subject: Late Bronze Age collapse
- Publisher: Princeton University Press
- Publication date: 2014
- Publication place: United States
- Media type: Print, e-book, audio book
- Pages: 264
- Awards: 2014 The New York Post's Best Books. 2014 The Australian's Best Books of the Year. 2015 The Federalist's Notable Books.
- ISBN: 9780691140896
- Dewey Decimal: 930.1'56-dc23
- LC Class: GN778.25.C55 2014 https://lccn.loc.gov/2013032059
- Website: Publisher - 1177 B.C

1177 B.C.: The Year Civilization Collapsed is a 2014 non-fiction book about the Late Bronze Age collapse by American archaeologist Eric H. Cline. It was published by Princeton University Press. An updated edition was published in 2021.

== Description ==
The book focuses on Cline's hypothesis for the Late Bronze Age collapse of civilization, a transition period that affected the Egyptians, Hittites, Canaanites, Cypriots, Minoans, Mycenaeans, Assyrians and Babylonians; varied heterogeneous cultures populating eight powerful and flourishing states intermingling via trade, commerce, exchange and "cultural piggybacking," despite "all the difficulties of travel and time". He presents evidence to support a "perfect storm" of "multiple interconnected failures," meaning that more than one natural and man-made cataclysm caused the disintegration and demise of an ancient civilization that incorporated "empires and globalized peoples." This ended the Bronze Age, and ended the Mycenaean, Minoan, Trojan, Hittite, and Babylonian cultures.

Before this book, the leading hypothesis during previous decades attributed the civilizations' collapse mostly to Sea Peoples of unknown origin.

== Awards ==
The book has won the following awards:

- Winner of the 2014 Award for the Best Popular Book, American Schools of Oriental Research
- Honorable Mention for the 2015 PROSE Award in Archeology & Anthropology, Association of American Publishers
- One of The New York Post's Best Books of 2014
- One of The Federalist's Notable Books of 2015
- One of The Australian's Best Books of the Year in 2014, chosen by filmmaker Bruce Beresford
- Selected as the 'Book of the Semester' Fall 2016, David M. Kennedy Center for International Studies at Brigham Young University

== See also ==
- Battle of the Delta
- Etymology of Syria
