= Pyla-Kokkinokremos =

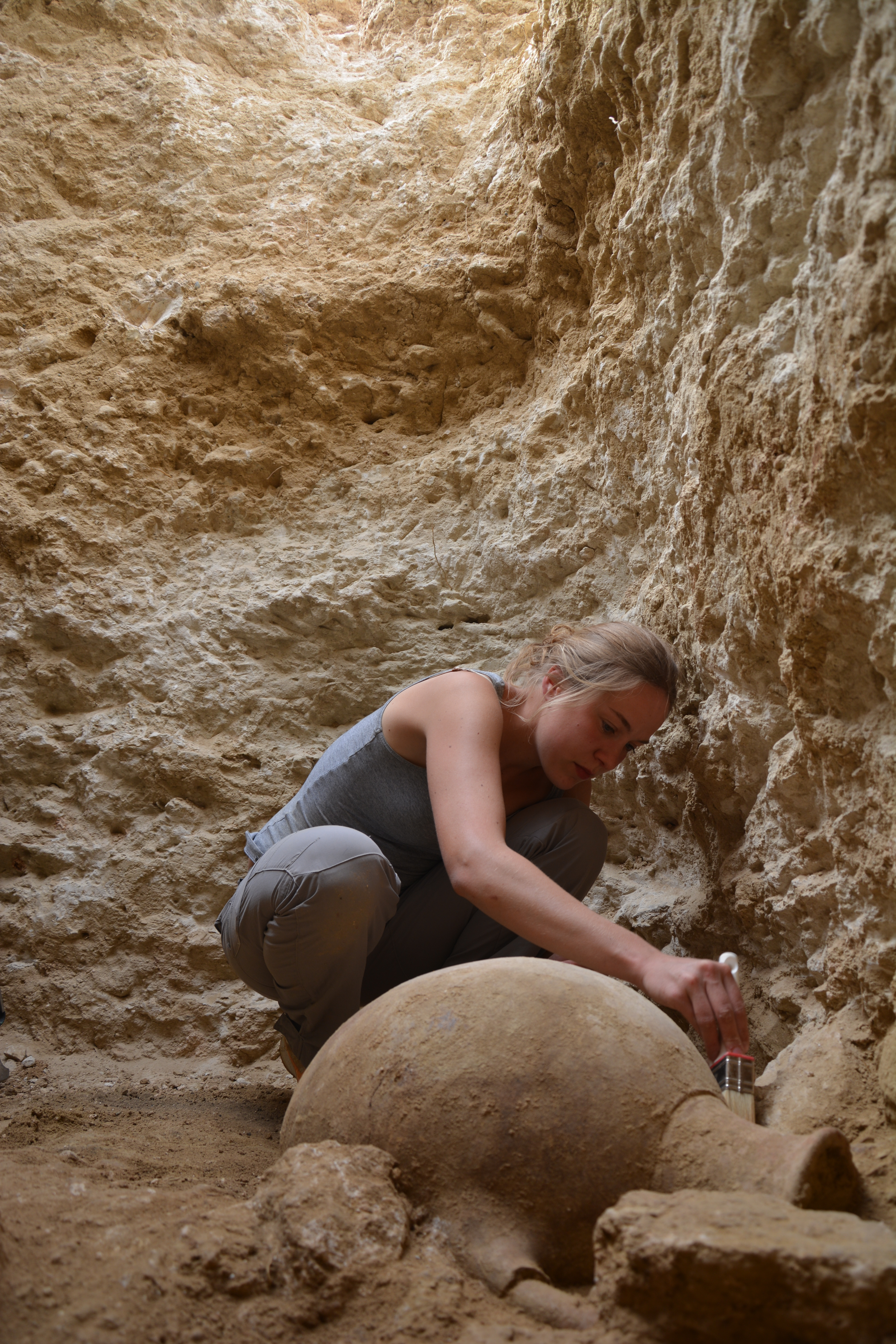
Excavation at Pyla-Kokkinokremos in 2015

Pyla-Kokkinokremos (Greek: Πύλα-Κοκκινόκρεμος) (red cliff) was a Late Bronze Age settlement on Cyprus, which was abandoned after a brief occupation.

== History ==
The site of Pyla-Kokkinokremos, located on a rocky plateau, lies about 10 km (6.2 mi) east of Larnaca and ancient Kition, and some 20 km (12 mi) southwest of Enkomi, two major Bronze Age centres of the 13th–12th centuries BC, the period known as Late Cypriot IIC and IIIA.

The site was explored by Porphyrios Dikaios in 1952, by Vassos Karageorghis in 1981 and 1982 and from 2010 to 2013, by Vassos Karageorghis and Athanasia Kanta. Since 2014, the excavation is a joint venture between Joachim Bretschneider (Ghent University), Jan Driessen (UCLouvain) and Athanasia Kanta (Mediterranean Archaeological Society).

Based on the different explorations, it can be assumed that the entire plateau of around seven hectares was densely occupied. Most telling is the excavation of part of a regularly laid-out settlement in the eastern and north-western sector of which the outer perimeter 'casemate' wall is assumed to have encircled the entire hill top plateau. The repetition of residential units within the excavated sectors appears to suggest that the establishment of the settlement was deliberate and planned. Moreover, the discovery of material culture, including several hidden hoards of precious metals, seems to indicate the planned and organized abandonment of the settlement; since the inhabitants never retrieved these hoards, it is believed they were killed or enslaved. Former excavations have yielded two tablets inscribed in Cypro-Minoan and have confirmed the international character of its material culture, such as Minoan, Canaanite, Mycenaean, Sardinian, Hittite and Cypriot ceramics. The recent excavation-project aims to get a better understanding of the multicultural character of the site, especially against the background of the continuing discussion on migration, interaction and acculturation, which typifies the late 13th and early 12th centuries BC in the Eastern Mediterranean.

Pyla-Kokkinokremos was established at a time when the Late Bronze Age collapse reached its zenith, just a few decades prior to its eventual seemingly premeditated abandonment. Since the settlement was never reoccupied and has a lifespan of less than fifty years, Pyla has become a valuable ‘time capsule’ of the LC IIC-IIIA critical phase. Owing to these facts together with its ethnically amalgamated material, the archaeological data from Pyla-Kokkinokremos surface as an exceptional opportunity to address the Late Bronze Age collapse and international contacts in the Levantine and Eastern Mediterranean world.

== See also ==
- Maa Palaeokastro

== Bibliography ==
- Bretschneider J./ Kanta A./ Driessen J., 2023: Excavations at Pyla-Kokkinokremos. Report of the 2014-2019 Campaigns. Aegis 24. Presses universitaires de Louvain.
- Bretschneider J./ Driessen J. / Kanta A., 2021: Cyprus and Ugarit at the end of the Late Bronze Age: Insights from Pyla-Kokkinokremos, in: Série Ras Shamra-Ougarit 28,607-638.
- Bretschneider J./ Kanta A./ Driessen J., 2018:Pyla-Kokkinokremos (Cyprus) : Preliminary report on the 2015-2016 Campaigns, in: Ugarit-Forschungen. Internationales Jahrbuch für die Altertumskunde Syriens-Palästinas 48, p. 39-120.
- Bretschneider J./ Kanta A./ Driessen J., 2015: Pyla-Kokkinokremos. Preliminary Report on the 2014 Excavations, in: Ugarit-Forschungen. Internationales Jahrbuch für die Altertumskunde Syriens-Palästinas 46, p. 1-37.
- Karagheorghis, V. / Kanta, A., 2014: Pyla-Kokkinokremos: A late 13th-century B.C. fortified settlement in Cyprus. Excavations 2010–2011. Studies in Mediterranean Archaeology 141. Uppsala: Åströms Förlag.
- Karagheorghis, V. / Demas M., 1984: Pyla-Kokkinokremos. A late 13th-century B.C. fortified settlement in Cyprus. Nicosia: Department of Antiquities, Cyprus
- Kaniewski D./ Marriner N./ Bretschneider J./ Jans G./ Morhange Ch./ Cheddadi R./ Otto Th./ Luce F./ Van Campo E., 2019: 300-year drought frames Late Bronze Age to Early Iron Age transition in the Near East. New palaeoecological data from Cyprus and Syria, in: Regional Environmental Change, 19(8). p.2287-2297.
