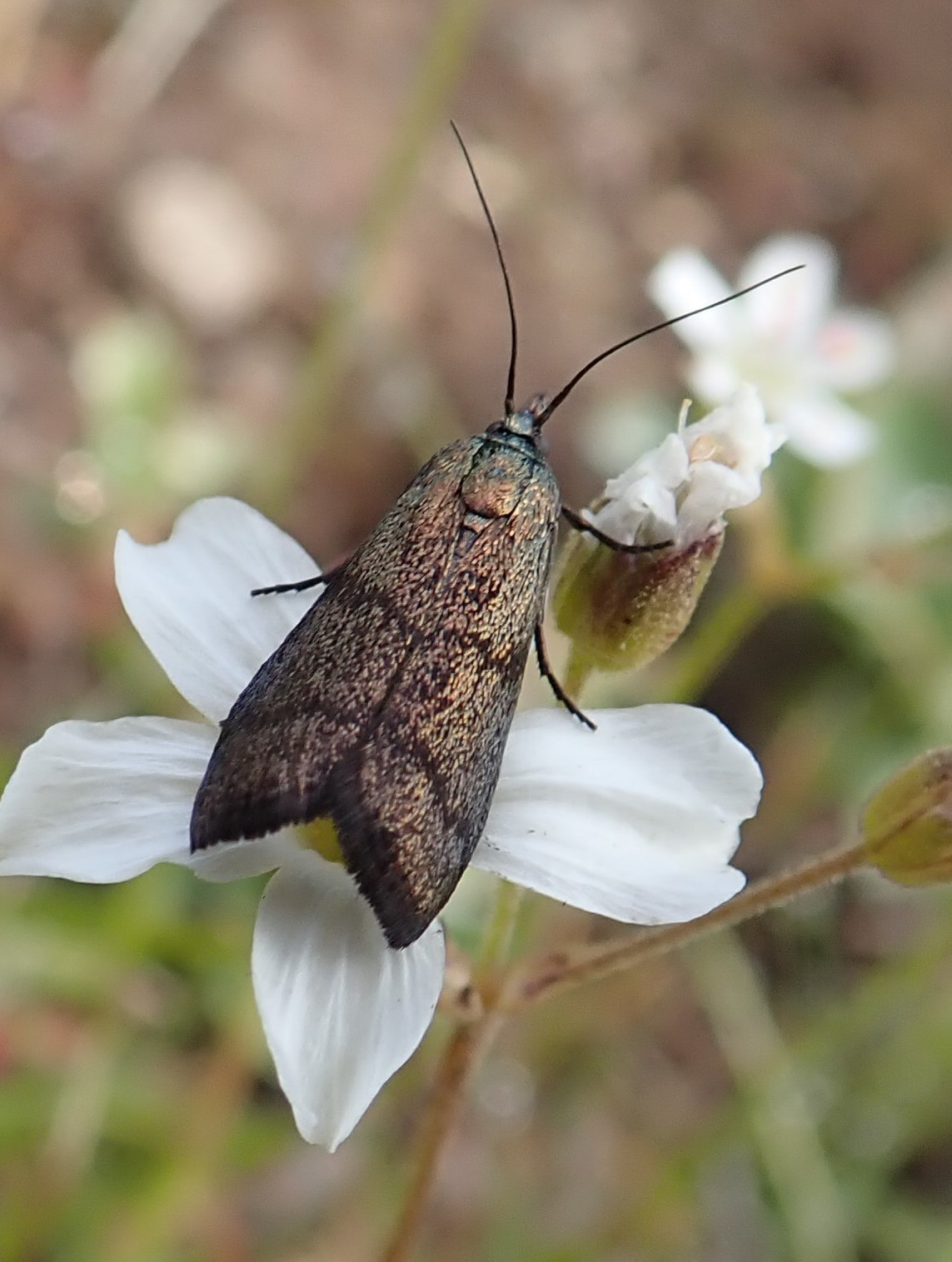
- Pyla scintillans, Canada

Scientific classification
- Kingdom: Animalia
- Phylum: Arthropoda
- Class: Insecta
- Order: Lepidoptera
- Family: Pyralidae
- Subfamily: Phycitinae
- Genus: Pyla; Grote, 1882

= Pyla (moth) =

Genus of moths

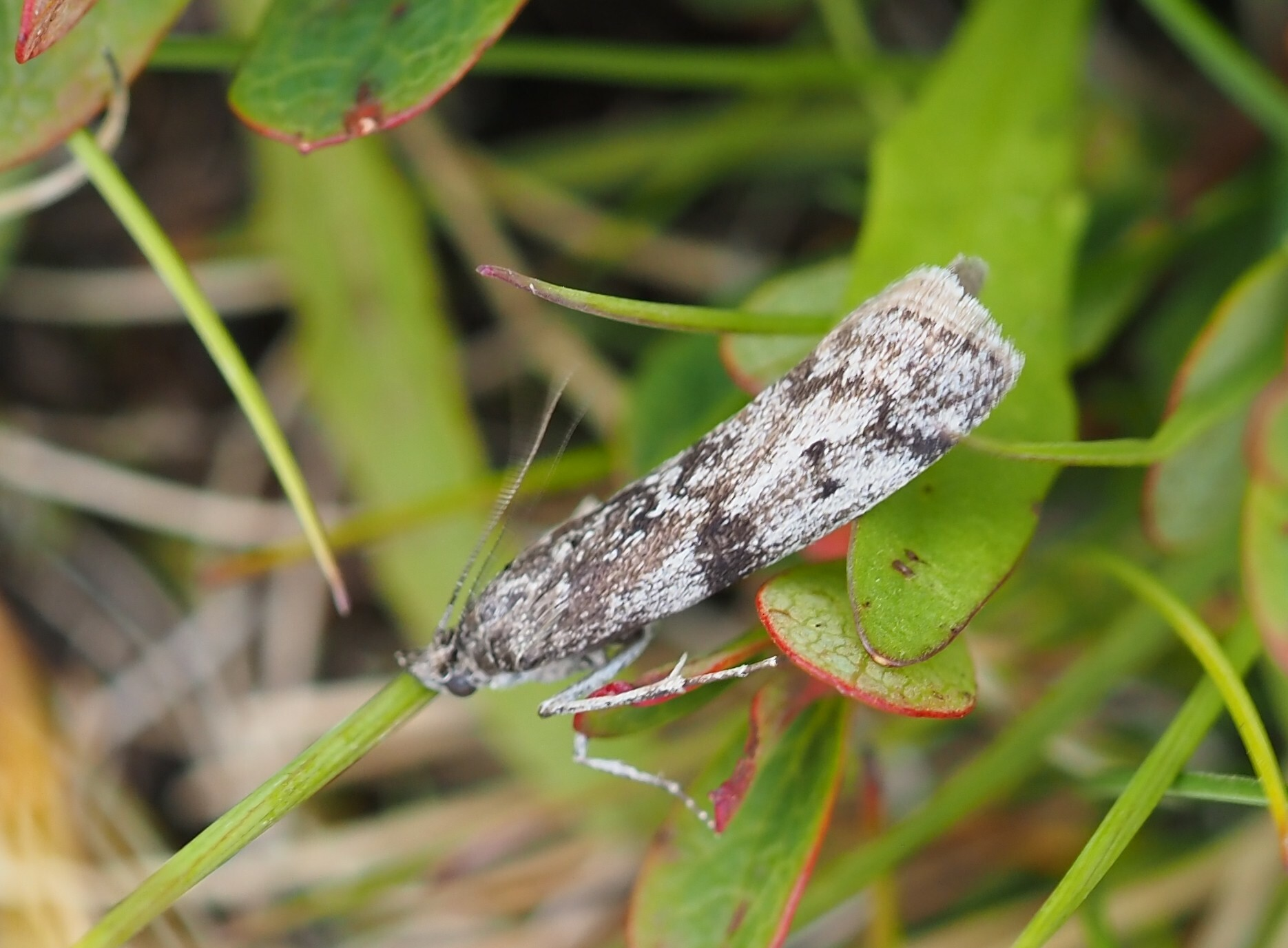
Pyla fusca, Iceland

Pyla is a genus of snout moths in the family Pyralidae. There are more than 20 described species in Pyla, found in North America, Europe, and Asia.

== Species ==
These 22 species belong to the genus Pyla:

- Pyla aeneela Hulst, 1895
- Pyla aeneoviridella Ragonot, 1887
- Pyla aenigmatica Heinrich, 1956
- Pyla aequivoca Heinrich, 1956
- Pyla arenaeola Balogh & Wilterding, 1998
- Pyla criddlella Dyar, 1907
- Pyla fasciella Barnes & McDunnough, 1917
- Pyla fasciolalis Hulst, 1886
- Pyla fusca Haworth, 1811
- Pyla hanhamella
- Pyla hypochalciella Ragonot, 1887
- Pyla impostor Heinrich, 1956
- Pyla insinuatrix Heinrich, 1956
- Pyla manifestella Inoue, 1982
- Pyla metalicella Hulst, 1895
- Pyla nigricula Heinrich, 1956
- Pyla postalbidior Rothschild, 1921
- Pyla rainierella Dyar, 1904
- Pyla scintillans Grote, 1881
- Pyla serrata Neunzig, 2003
- Pyla viridisuffusella Barnes & McDunnough, 1917
- Pyla westerlandi Wilterding & Balogh, 2002
