= Late Bronze Age collapse =

Societal collapse in the Late Bronze Age

Invasions, destruction and population movements during the Late Bronze Age collapse

The Late Bronze Age collapse was a period of societal collapse in the Mediterranean basin during the late 13th to early 12th century BC. It is thought to have affected much of the Eastern Mediterranean and Near East, in particular Egypt, Anatolia, the Aegean region, eastern Libya, and the Balkans. The collapse was sudden, violent, and culturally disruptive for many Bronze Age civilizations, creating a sharp material decline for the region's previously existing powers.

The palace economy of Mycenaean Greece, the Aegean region, and Anatolia that characterized the Late Bronze Age broke apart into the small isolated village cultures of the Greek Dark Ages, which lasted from c. 1200 BC to c. 800 BC and were followed by the better‑known Archaic Age. The Hittite Empire spanning Anatolia and the Levant collapsed, while states such as the Middle Assyrian Empire and the New Kingdom of Egypt survived in weakened forms. Other cultures, such as the Phoenicians, enjoyed increased autonomy and power with the waning military presence of Egypt and Assyria in West Asia.

Competing theories of the cause of the Late Bronze Age collapse have been proposed since the 19th century, with most involving the violent destruction of cities and towns. These include climate change, earthquakes and volcanic eruptions, droughts, epidemic disease, invasions by the Sea Peoples, economic disruptions due to increased ironworking, and changes in military technology. Following the collapse, gradual changes in metallurgic technology led to the subsequent Iron Age across Europe, Asia, and Africa during the 1st millennium BC. Scholarship in the late 20th and early 21st century introduced views that the collapse was more limited in scale and scope than previously thought.

== Scholarship ==
The German historian Arnold Hermann Ludwig Heeren first dated the Late Bronze Age collapse to 1200 BC. In an 1817 history of Ancient Greece, Heeren stated that the first period of Greek prehistory ended around this time, based on a dating of the fall of Troy to 1190 BC. In 1826, he dated the end of the Nineteenth Dynasty of Egypt to around the same time. Also occurring in the first half of the 12th century BC were the Sea Peoples invasions, the collapse of Mycenaean Greece and the Kassites in Babylonia, and the carving of the Merneptah Stele. This period also saw the destruction of Ugarit and the Amorite states in the Levant, the fragmentation of western Anatolia's Luwian states, and chaos in Canaan. The deterioration of these governments interrupted trade routes and led to severely reduced literacy rates in much of this area.

=== Debate ===
Initially, historians believed that in the first phase of this period, almost every city between Pylos and Gaza was violently destroyed, and many were abandoned, including Hattusa, Mycenae, and Ugarit, with Robert Drews claiming that, "Within a period of forty to fifty years at the end of the thirteenth and the beginning of the twelfth century, almost every significant city in the eastern Mediterranean world was destroyed, many of them never to be occupied again."

However, more recent research has shown that Drews overestimated the number of destroyed cities and referenced destructions that never happened. According to ancient historian and archaeologist Jesse Millek:

If one goes through archaeological literature from the past 150 years, there are 148 sites with 153 destruction events ascribed to the end of the Late Bronze Age ca. 1200 BC. However, of these, 94, or 61%, have either been misdated, assumed based on little evidence, or simply never happened at all. For Drews's map, and his subsequent discussion of some other sites which he believed were destroyed ca. 1200 BC, of the 60 "destructions" 31, or 52%, are false destructions. The complete list of false destructions includes other notable sites such as: Lefkandi, Orchomenos, Athens, Knossos, Alassa, Carchemish, Aleppo, Alalakh, Hama, Qatna, Kadesh, Tell Tweini, Byblos, Tyre, Sidon, Ashdod, Ashkelon, Beth-Shean, Tell Dier Alla, and many more.

Ann Killebrew has demonstrated that cities such as Jerusalem functioned as important walled settlements during the West Asian Middle Bronze IIB and Iron Age IIC periods (c. 1800–1550 and c. 720–586 BC), yet in the intervening Late Bronze (LB) and Iron Age I and IIA/B periods, sites like Jerusalem remained small, relatively insignificant, and unfortified. Some recent writing argues that although some collapses may have happened in this period, these may not have been widespread.

== Background ==
Advanced civilizations with extensive trade networks and complex sociopolitical institutions characterized the Late Bronze Age (c. 1550–1200 BC). Prominent societies (Egyptians, Hittites, Mesopotamians, and Mycenaeans) exhibited monumental architecture, advanced metallurgy, and literacy. Flourishing trade in copper, timber, pottery, and agricultural goods, as well as diplomatic ties progressively deepened their interdependence. Geopolitical powers of the time relied on variations of the palace economy system, in which wealth is first concentrated in a centralized bureaucracy before being redistributed according to the sovereign's agenda, a system which primarily benefits the society's elite. This intricate web of dependencies, coupled with the inflexibility of the palace system, exposed these civilizations to the cascading effects of distant disturbances.

== Evidence ==
=== Anatolia ===
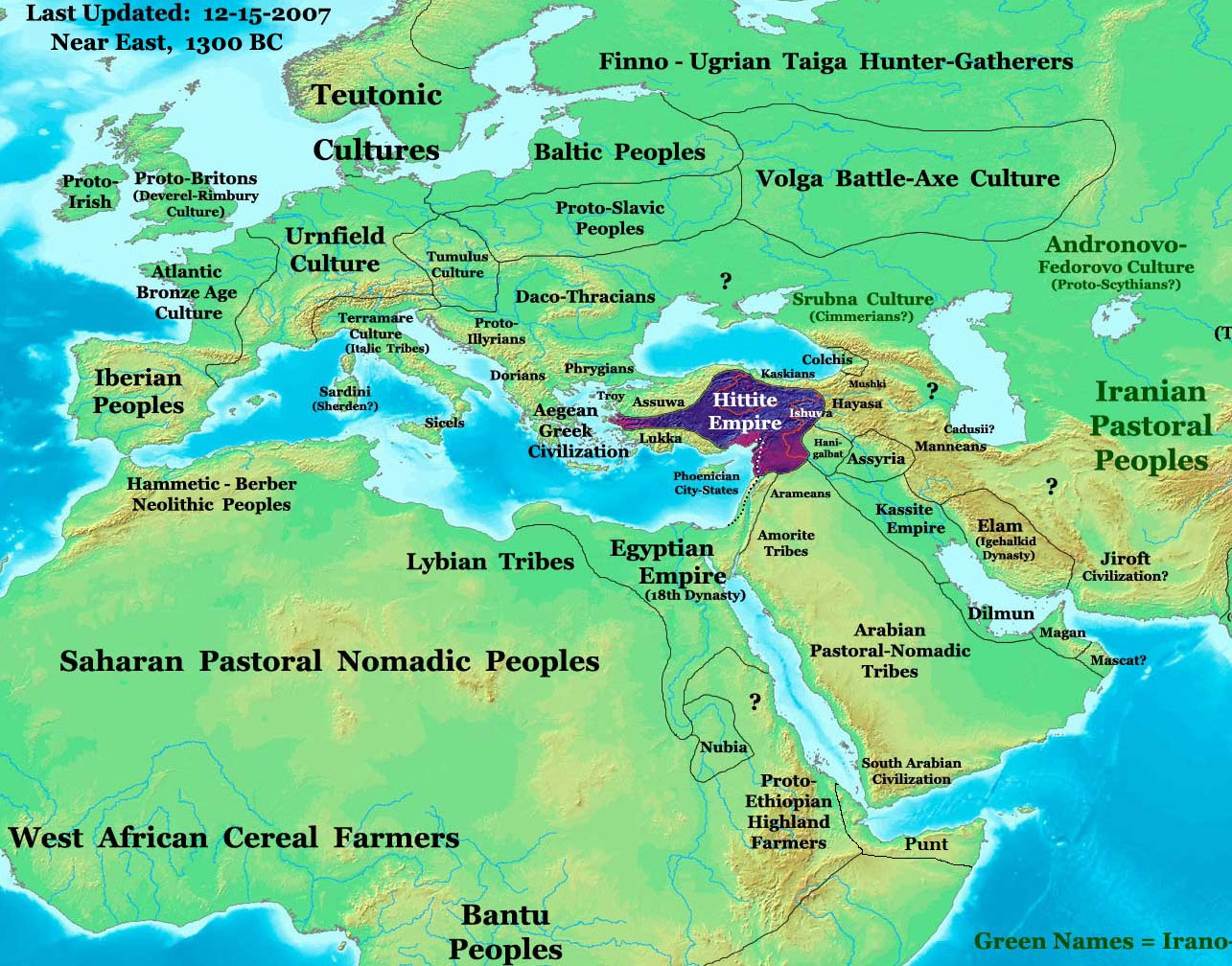
The Hittite Empire around 1300 BC

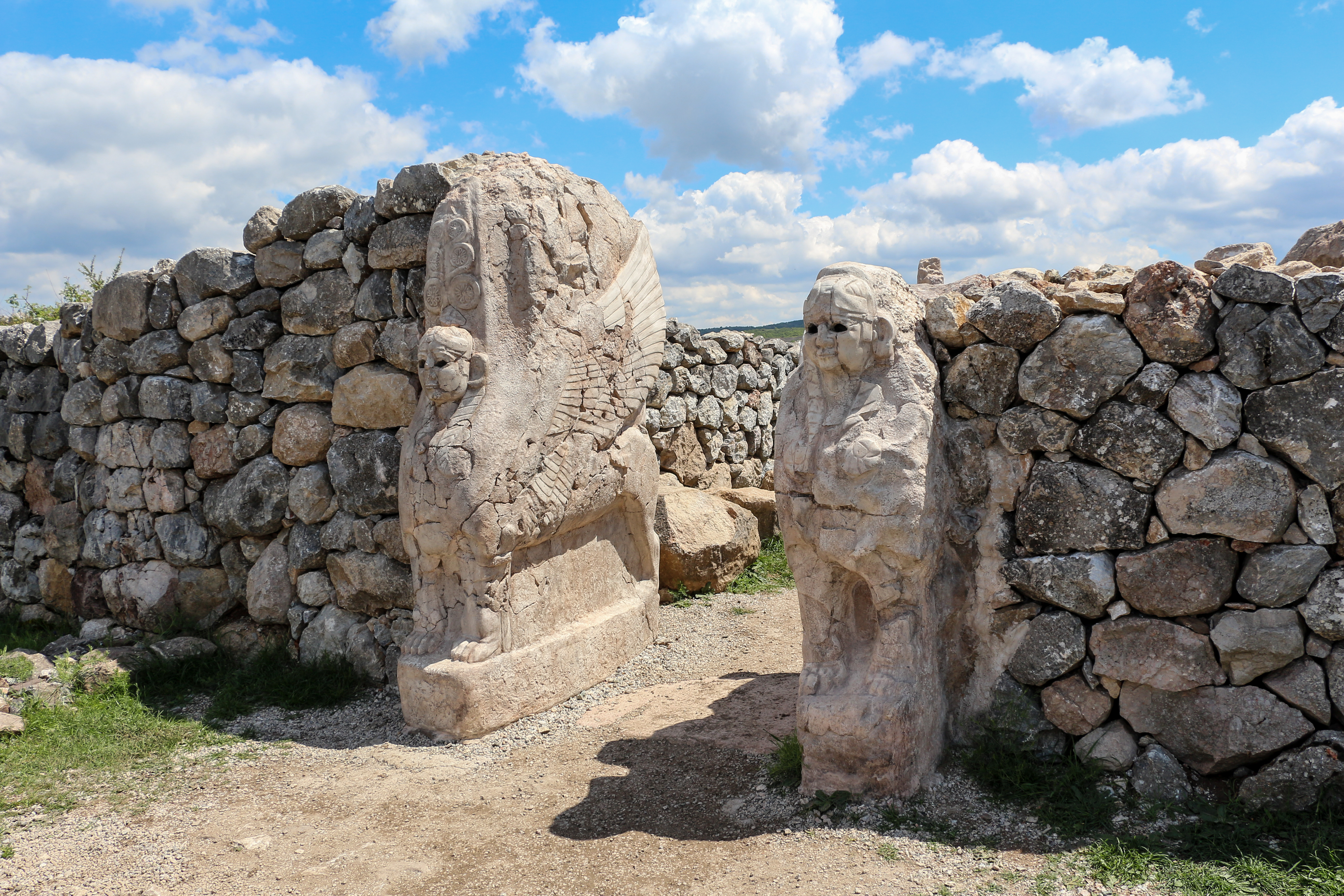
Ruins of the Sphinx Gate entrance to the Hittite city of Hattusa

Many Anatolian sites were destroyed at the Late Bronze Age, and the area appears to have undergone extreme political decentralization. For much of the Late Bronze Age, Anatolia had been dominated by the Hittite Empire, but by 1200 BC, the state was already fragmenting under the strain of famine, plague, and civil war. The Hittite capital of Hattusa was burned at an unknown date in this general period, though it may in fact have been abandoned at that point. Karaoğlan, (Note: The name Karaoğlan is Turkish; the original Hittite name is unknown.) near present-day Ankara, was burned and the corpses left unburied. Many Anatolian sites have destruction layers dating to this general period. Some of them such as Troy were immediately rebuilt, while others such as Kaymakçı were abandoned.

This period appears to have also been a time of migration. For instance, some evidence suggests that the Phrygians arrived in Anatolia during this period, possibly through the Bosporus or over the Caucasus Mountains.

Initially, the Assyrian Empire maintained a presence in the area. However, it gradually withdrew from much of the region for a time in the second half of the 11th century BC.

=== Cyprus ===
During the reign of the Tudḫaliya IV (reigned c. 1237–1209 BC), the island was briefly invaded by the Hittites, either to secure the copper resource or as a way of preventing piracy. Shortly afterwards, the island was reconquered by his son Suppiluliuma II around 1200 BC.

There is little evidence of destruction on the island of Cyprus in the years surrounding 1200 BC which marks the separation between the Late Cypriot II (LCII) from the LCIII period. The city of Kition is commonly cited as destroyed at the end of the LC IIC, but the excavator, Vassos Karageorghis, made it expressly clear that it was not destroyed, stating, "At Kition, major rebuilding was carried out in both excavated Areas I and II, but there is no evidence of violent destruction; on the contrary, we observe a cultural continuity." Jesse Millek has demonstrated that while it is possible that the city of Enkomi was destroyed, the archaeological evidence is not clear. Both Enkomi buildings from the end of LC IIC showed limited burning, with most rooms undamaged. The same can be said for the site of Sinda as it is not clear if it was destroyed since only some ash was found but no other evidence that the city was destroyed like fallen walls or burnt rubble. The only settlement on Cyprus that has clear evidence it was destroyed around 1200 BC was Maa Palaeokastro, which was likely destroyed by some sort of attack, though the excavators were not sure who attacked it, saying, "We might suggest that [the attackers] were 'pirates', 'adventurers' or remnants of the 'Sea Peoples', but this is simply another way of saying that we do not know."

Several settlements on Cyprus were abandoned at the end of the LC IIC or during the first half of the 12th century BC without destruction such as Pyla Kokkinokremmos, Toumba tou Skourou, Alassa, and Maroni-Vournes. While the Eastern Mediterranean declined, parts of Cyprus such as Kition and Paphos prospered after 1200 BC during the LC IIIA.

=== Greece ===
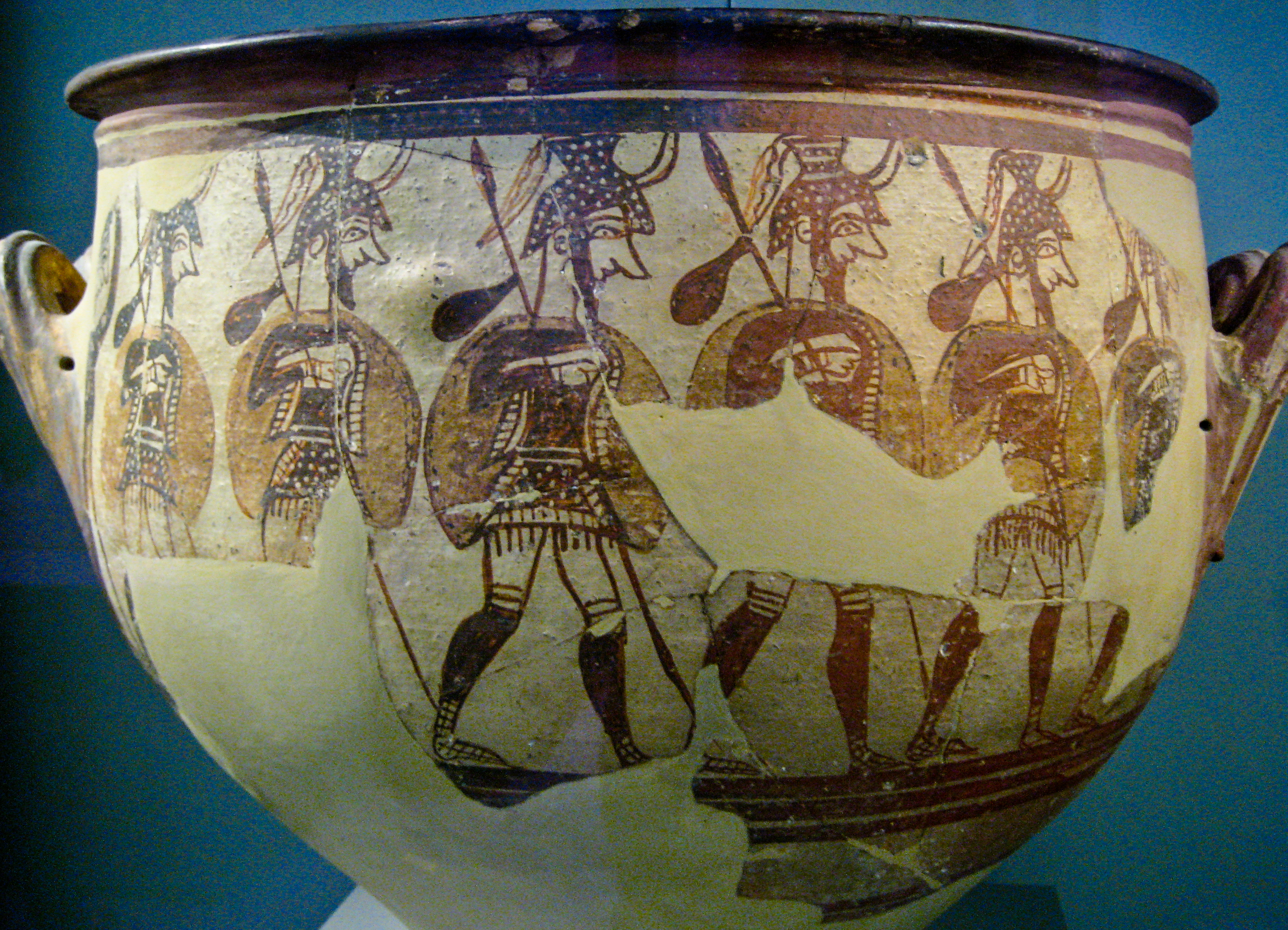
Marching soldiers on the Warrior Vase, c. 1200 BC, a krater from Mycenae

Destruction was heaviest at palaces and fortified sites, and none of the Mycenaean palaces of the Late Bronze Age survived (with the possible exception of the Cyclopean fortifications on the Acropolis of Athens). Thebes was one of the earliest examples of this, having its palace sacked repeatedly between 1300 and 1200 BC and eventually completely destroyed by fire. The extent of this destruction is highlighted by Robert Drews, who reasons that the destruction was such that Thebes did not resume a significant position in Greece until at least the late 12th century BC. Many other sites offer less conclusive causes; for example, it is unclear what happened at Athens, although it is clear that the settlement saw a significant decline during the Bronze Age Collapse. While there is no evidence of remnants of a destroyed palace or central structure, a change in location of living quarters and burial sites demonstrates a significant recession. Furthermore, the increase in fortification at this site suggests much fear of the decline in Athens. Vincent Desborough asserts that this is evidence of later migrations away from the city in reaction to its initial decline, although a significant population did remain. It remains possible that this emigration from Athens was not flight from violence. Nancy Demand posits that environmental changes could have played an important role in the collapse of Athens. In particular, Demand notes the presence of "enclosed and protected means of access to water sources at Athens" as evidence of persistent droughts in the region that could have resulted in a fragile reliance on imports.

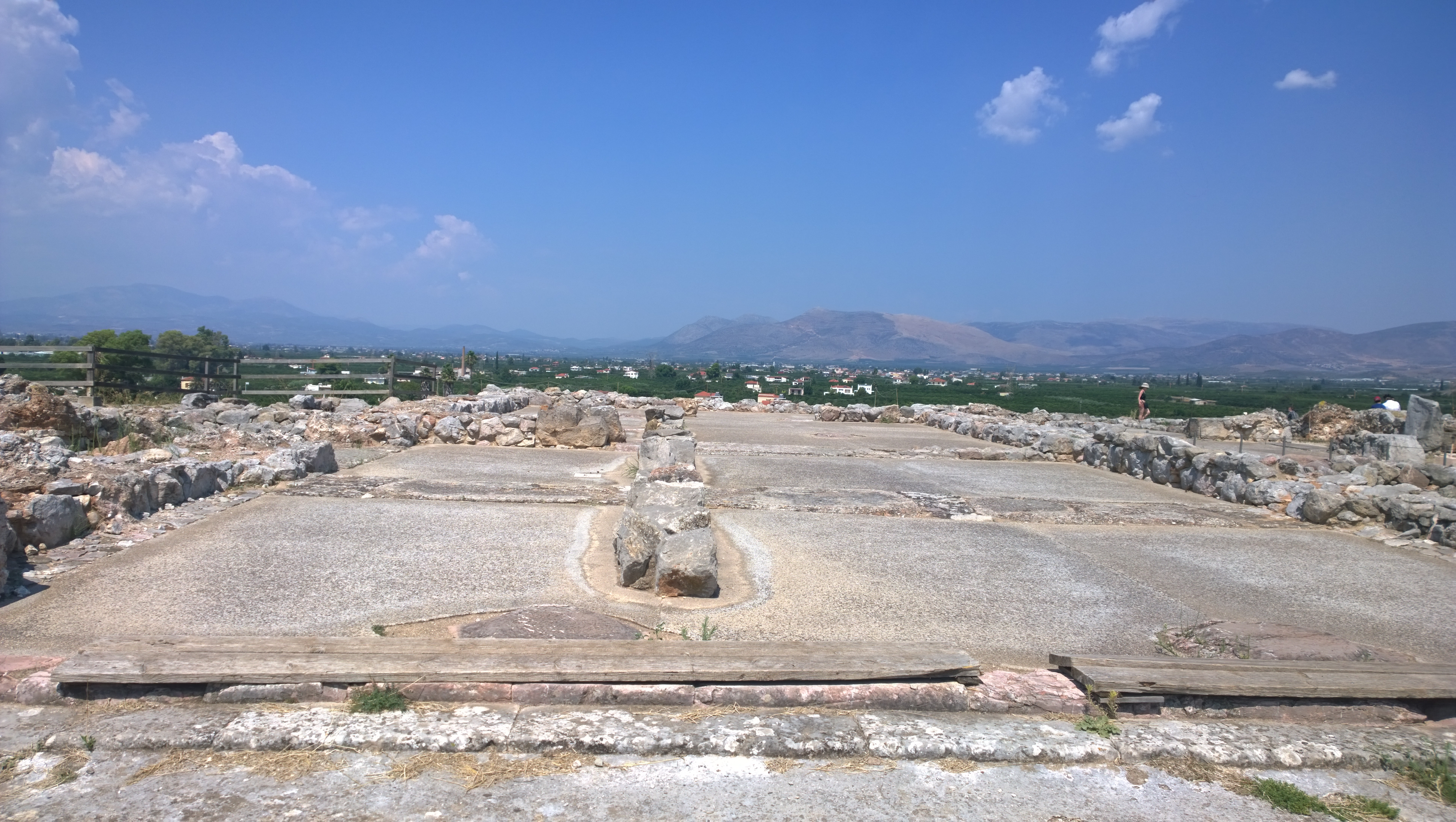
View of the Megaron of the palace at Tiryns, one of the many Greek palaces destroyed during the Bronze Age Collapse

Up to 90% of small sites in the Peloponnese were abandoned, suggesting a major depopulation. The extent of this destruction remains unclear, as at many other Greek sites. The city of Mycenae, for example, was initially destroyed in an earthquake in 1250 BC as evidenced by the presence of crushed bodies buried in collapsed buildings. However, the site was rebuilt only to face destruction in 1190 BC as the result of a series of major fires. There is a suggestion by Robert Drews that the fires could have been the result of an attack on the site and its palace; however, Eric Cline points out the lack of archaeological evidence for an attack. Thus, while fire was definitely the cause of the destruction, it is unclear what or who caused it. A similar situation occurred at Tiryns in 1200 BC, when an earthquake destroyed much of the city including its palace. It is likely however that the city continued to be inhabited for some time following the earthquake. As a result, there is a general agreement that earthquakes did not permanently destroy Mycenae or Tiryns because, as is highlighted by Guy Middleton, "Physical destruction then cannot fully explain the collapse". Drews points out that there was continued occupation at these sites, accompanied by attempts to rebuild, demonstrating the continuation of Tiryns as a settlement. Demand proposes that the cause may once more have been environmental, chiefly a shortfall in domestic food production and the palaces' function in administering and stockpiling imported food, meaning their destruction would have merely aggravated the paramount issue of food scarcity. The importance of trade as a factor is supported by Spyros Iakovidis, who points out the lack of evidence for violent or sudden decline in Mycenae.

Pylos offers some more clues to its destruction, as the intensive and extensive destruction by fire around 1180 BC reflects the violent destruction of the city. There is some evidence of Pylos expecting a seaborne attack, with tablets at Pylos discussing "Watchers guarding the coast". Eric Cline rebuts the idea that this is evidence of an attack by Sea People, pointing out that the tablet does not say what is being watched for or why. Cline does not see naval attacks as playing a role in Pylos's decline. Demand, however, argues that, regardless of what the threat from the sea was, it likely played a role in the decline, at least in hindering trade and perhaps vital food imports.

The Bronze Age collapse marked the start of what has been called the Greek Dark Ages, which lasted roughly 400 years and ended with the establishment of Archaic Greece. Other cities, such as Athens, continued to be occupied, but with a more local sphere of influence, limited evidence of trade and an impoverished culture, from which it took centuries to recover.

These sites in Greece show evidence of the collapse: Knossos, Kydonia, Lefkandi, Menelaion, Mycenae, Nichoria, Pylos, Teichos Dymaion, Thebes, Tiryns, and Iolkos .

=== Egypt ===
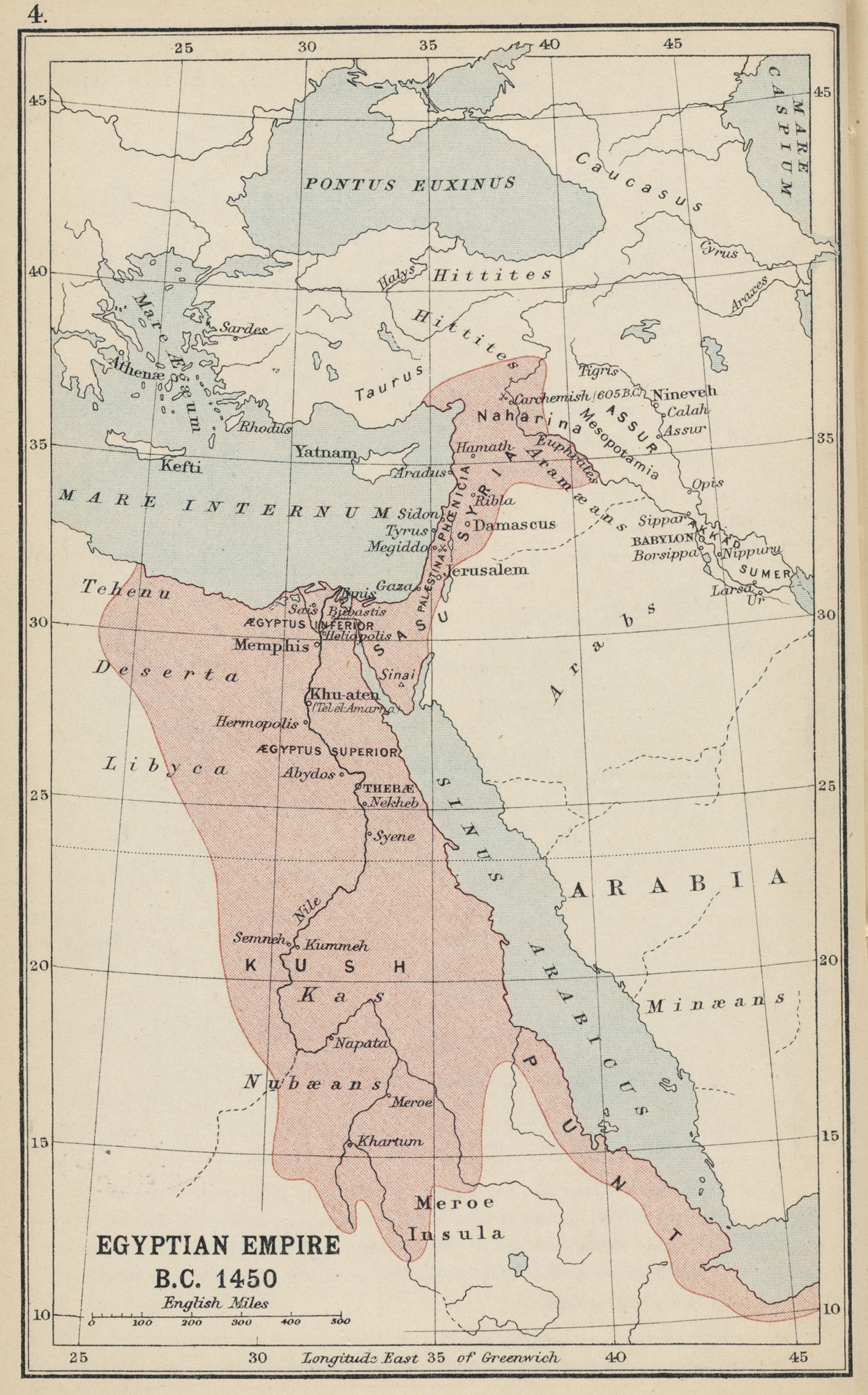
Egyptian Empire at 1450 BC

While it survived the Bronze Age collapse, the Egyptian Empire of the New Kingdom era receded considerably in territorial and economic strength during the mid-twelfth century (during the reign of Ramesses VI, 1145 to 1137 BC). Previously, the Merneptah Stele (c. 1200 BC) spoke of attacks (Libyan War) from Putrians (from modern Libya), with associated people of Ekwesh, Shekelesh, Lukka, Shardana and Teresh (possibly an Egyptian name for the Tyrrhenians or Troas), and a Canaanite revolt, in the cities of Ashkelon, Yenoam and among the people of Israel. A second attack (Battle of the Delta and Battle of Djahy) during the reign of Ramesses III (1186–1155 BC) involved Peleset, Tjeker, Shardana, and Denyen.

The Nubian War, the First Libyan War, the Northern War and the Second Libyan War were all victories for Ramesses, but the expense strained the Egyptian economy and nearly bankrupted the state treasury. Nevertheless, the defeat of the invading Sea Peoples, Libyans, and Nubians secured Egypt's frontiers during the age of collapse. Ramesses III boasted: "My sword is great and mighty like that of Montu. No land can stand fast before my arms. I am a king rejoicing in slaughter. My reign is calmed in peace."

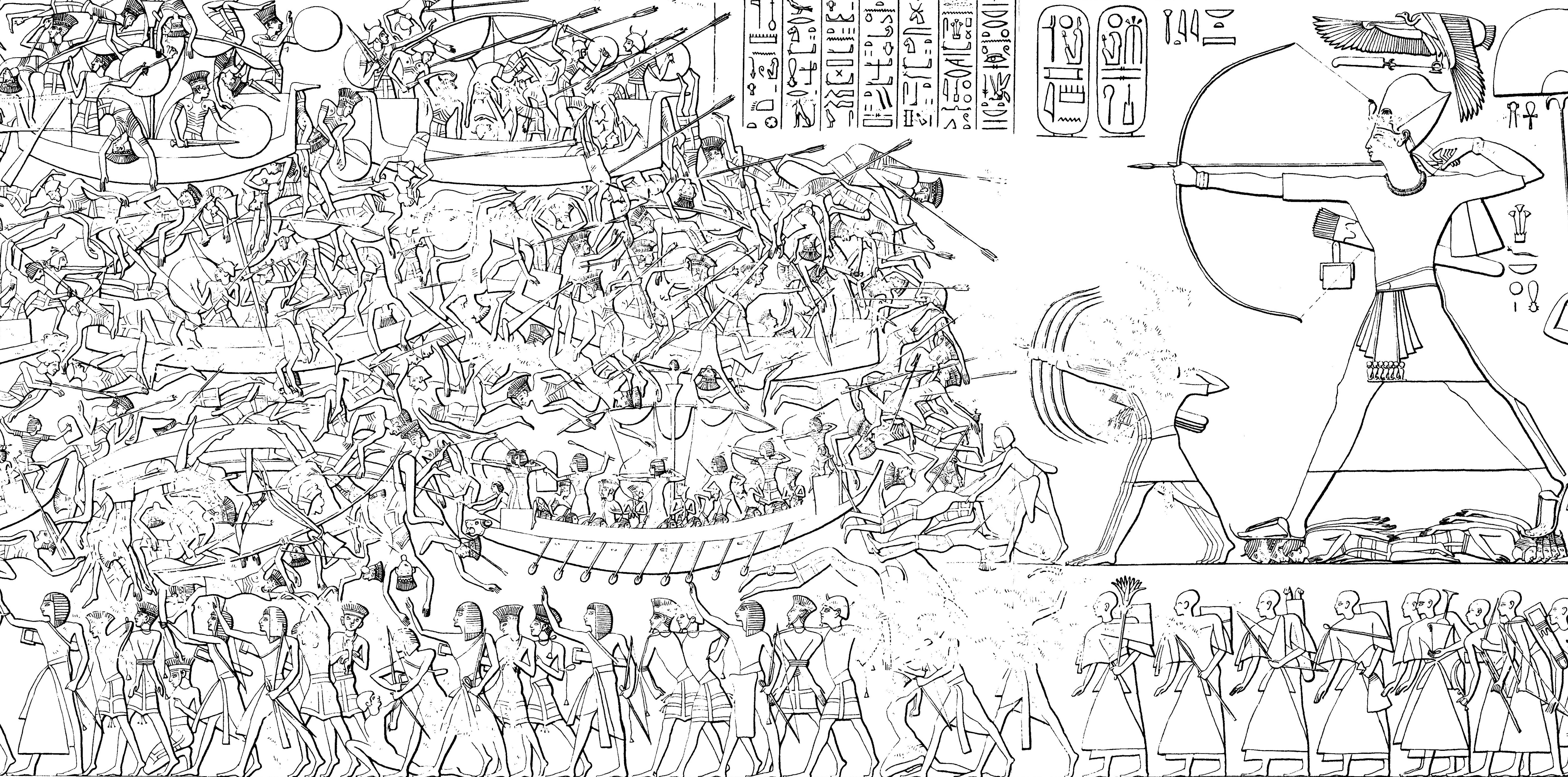
Sea Peoples in their ships during the battle with the Egyptians. Relief from the mortuary temple of Ramesses III at Medinet Habu

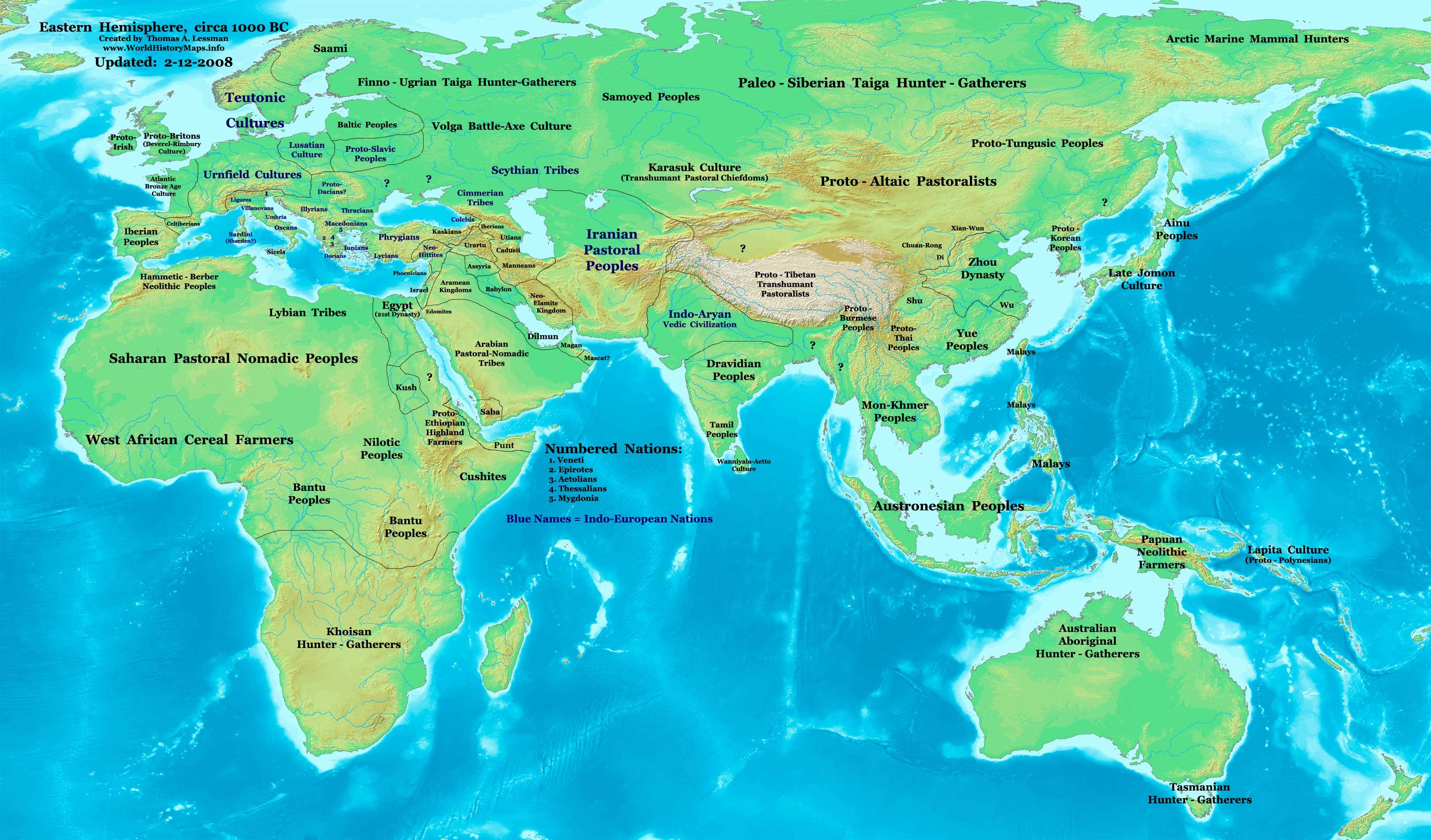
The main polities in Eurasia around 1000 BC

Egypt withdrew from the Southern Levant over about a hundred years, most likely due to the political turmoil in Egypt proper. Many Egyptian garrisons or sites with an "Egyptian governor's residence" in the Southern Levant were abandoned without destruction, including Deir al-Balah, Ashkelon, Tel Mor, Tell el-Far'ah (South), Tel Gerisa, Tell Jemmeh, Tel Masos, and Qubūr al-Walaydah. Not all Egyptian sites in the Southern Levant were abandoned peacefully. The Egyptian garrison at Aphek was destroyed, likely by warfare, at the end of the 13th century. The Egyptian gate complex uncovered at Jaffa was destroyed between 1134 and 1115 BC based on C14 dates, while Beit She'an was partially destroyed, possibly by an earthquake, in the mid-12th century.

=== The Levant ===
Egyptian evidence shows that from the reign of Horemheb (ruled either 1319 or 1306 to 1292 BC), wandering Shasu were more problematic than the earlier ʿApiru. Ramesses II (r. 1279–1213 BC) campaigned against them, pursuing them as far as Moab, where he established a fortress after a near defeat at the Battle of Kadesh. During the reign of Merneptah, the Shasu threatened the "Way of Horus" north from Gaza. Evidence shows that Deir Alla (Succoth) was destroyed, likely by an earthquake, after the reign of the female pharaoh Tausret (r. 1191–1189 BC) though the date of this destruction appears to be much later dating to roughly 1150 BC.

There is little evidence that any major city or settlement in the Southern Levant was destroyed around 1200 BC. At Lachish, the Fosse Temple III underwent ritual termination, and a house in Area S seems to have burned in a house fire because the most severe burning evidence was located beside two ovens, with no other part of the city exhibiting any burning. After this, the city was rebuilt more lavishly than before. For Megiddo, most parts of the city did not have any signs of damage and although it is possible that the palace in Area AA might have been destroyed, this is not for certain. While the monumental structures at Hazor were indeed destroyed, the destruction occurred in the mid-13th century, long before the end of the Late Bronze Age. Many sites were not burned to the ground around 1200 BC, including Ashkelon, Ashdod, Tell es-Safi, Tel Batash, Tel Burna, Tel Dor, Tel Gerisa, Tell Jemmeh, Khirbet Rabud, Tel Zeror, and Tell Abu Hawam.

During the reign of Ramesses III, Philistines were allowed to resettle the coastal strip from Gaza to Joppa, Denyen (possibly the tribe of Dan in the Bible, or more likely the people of Adana, also known as Danuna, part of the Hittite Empire) settled from Joppa to Acre, and Tjekker in Acre. As the Story of Wenamun shows, the sites quickly achieved independence.

Despite many theories claiming that trade relations broke down in the southern Levant after 1200 BC, there is ample evidence that trade with other regions continued after the end of the Late Bronze Age. Archaeologist Jesse Millek has shown that while the common assumption is that trade in Cypriot and Mycenaean pottery ended around 1200 BC, trade in Cypriot pottery actually largely came to an end in 1300 BC, while for Mycenaean pottery, this trade ended in 1250 BC; destruction around 1200 BC could not have affected either pattern of international trade since both ended before the end of the Late Bronze Age. Millek also demonstrated that trade with Egypt continued following 1200 BC. Archaeometallurgical studies performed by various teams have also shown that trade in tin–a non-local and essential metal for bronze production–neither stopped nor decreased after 1200 BC, despite that the closest sources of the metal were the (modern) regions of Afghanistan, Kazakhstan, or perhaps even Cornwall, England. Lead from Sardinia was still being imported to the southern Levant following 1200 BC during the early Iron Age.

These sites in the Southern Levant show evidence of the collapse: Akko, Ashdod, Ashkelon, Bethel, Beth Shemesh, Deir 'Alla (Sukkot), Tel Hazor, Tel Lachish, and Tel Megiddo.

=== Mesopotamia ===
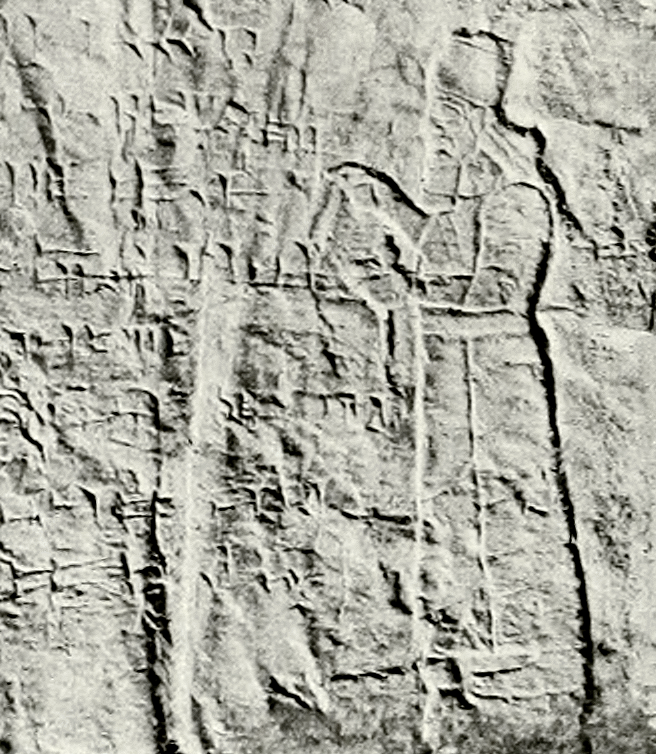
A Middle Assyrian carved relief depicting Tiglath-Pileser I (r. 1114–1076 BC)

The Middle Assyrian Empire (1392–1056 BC) had destroyed the Hurrian-Mitanni Empire, annexed much of the Hittite Empire and eclipsed the Egyptian Empire. At the beginning of the Late Bronze Age collapse, it controlled an empire stretching from the Caucasus Mountains in the north to the Arabian Peninsula in the south, and from ancient Iran in the east to Cyprus in the west. However, in the 12th century BC Assyrian satrapies in Anatolia came under attack from the Mushki (who may have been Phrygians) and those in the Levant from Arameans. Tiglath-Pileser I (reigned 1114–1076 BC) was able to defeat and repel these attacks. The Middle Assyrian Empire survived intact throughout much of this period, with Assyria dominating and often ruling Babylonia directly, and controlling southeastern and southwestern Anatolia, northwestern Iran and much of northern and central Syria and Canaan, as far as the Mediterranean and Cyprus.

The Arameans and Phrygians were subjugated, and Assyria and its colonies were not threatened by the Sea Peoples who had ravaged Egypt and much of the East Mediterranean. The Assyrians often conquered as far as Phoenicia and the East Mediterranean. However, after the death of Ashur-bel-kala in 1056, Assyria withdrew to areas close to its natural borders, encompassing what is today northern Iraq, northeastern Syria, the fringes of northwestern Iran, and southeastern Turkey. It retained a stable monarchy, the best army in the world, and an efficient civil administration, enabling it to survive the Bronze Age Collapse intact. Assyrian written records remained numerous and the most consistent in the world during the period, and the Assyrians were still able to mount long range military campaigns in all directions when necessary. From the late 10th century BC, Assyria once more asserted itself internationally, and the Neo-Assyrian Empire grew to be the largest the world had yet seen.

The situation in Babylonia was very different. After the Assyrian withdrawal, it was still subject to periodic Assyrian (and Elamite) subjugation. New groups of Semitic speakers such as the Arameans and Suteans (and in the period following the Bronze Age Collapse, Chaldeans as well) spread unchecked into Babylonia from the Levant. The weak power of Babylonian kings barely extended beyond the city limits of Babylon. Babylon was sacked by the Elamites under Shutruk-Nahhunte (c. 1185–1155 BC) and lost control of the Diyala River valley to Assyria.

=== Syria ===
Ancient Syria had been initially dominated by a number of indigenous Semitic-speaking peoples. The modern term "Syria" is a later Indo-European corruption of "Assyria", which only became formally applied to the Levant during the Seleucid Empire (323–150 BC) (see Etymology of Syria). The East Semitic-speaking polities of Ebla and the Akkadian Empire, the Northwest Semitic-speaking Amorites ("Amurru"), and the people of Ugarit were prominent among them. Syria during this time was known as "the land of the Amurru".

Before and during the Bronze Age Collapse, specifically between the 15th and late 13th centuries BC, Syria became a battleground for the Hittites, the Middle Assyrian Empire, the Mitanni, and the New Kingdom of Egypt. The Assyrians destroyed the Hurri-Mitanni empire and annexed much of the Hittite empire. The Egyptian empire had withdrawn from the region after failing to overcome the Hittites and, being fearful of the ever-growing Assyrian might, left much of the region under Assyrian control until the late 11th century BC. Later, the coastal regions came under attack from the Sea Peoples. During this period, from the 12th century BC onward, the incoming Northwest Semitic–speaking Arameans came to demographic prominence in Syria; the region outside of the Canaanite-speaking Phoenician coastal areas eventually came to speak Aramaic. This region eventually came to be known as Aramea and Eber Nari.

The Babylonians belatedly attempted to gain a foothold in the region during their brief revival under Nebuchadnezzar I in the 12th century BC but they, too, were overcome by their Assyrian neighbors.

Late Bronze Age Levantine sites previously showed evidence of trade links with Mesopotamia (Sumer, Akkad, Assyria, and Babylonia), Anatolia (Hattia, Hurria, Luwia, and later, the Hittites), Egypt, and the Aegean. Evidence at Ugarit shows that the destruction occurred after the reign of Merneptah (r. 1213–1203 BC) and even the fall of Chancellor Bay (d. 1192 BC). The last Bronze Age king of Ugarit, Ammurapi, was a contemporary of the last-known Hittite king, Suppiluliuma II. The exact dates of his reign are unknown.

A letter by the king is preserved on one of the clay tablets found baked in the conflagration of the city. Ammurapi stresses the seriousness of the crisis faced by many Levantine states due to attacks. In his response to a plea for assistance from the king of Alasiya, Ammurapi highlights the desperate situation Ugarit faced in letter RS 18.147:

My father, behold, the enemy's ships came [here]; my cities[?] were burned, and they did evil things in my country. Does not my father know that all my troops and chariots[?] are in the Land of Hatti, and all my ships are in the Land of Lukka? ... Thus, the country is abandoned to itself. May my father know it: the seven ships of the enemy that came here inflicted much damage upon us.

Eshuwara, the senior governor of Cyprus, responded in letter RS 20.18:

As for the matter concerning those enemies: [It was] the people from your country [and] your own ships [who] did this! And [it was] the people from your country [who] committed these transgression(s) ... I am writing to inform you and protect you. Be aware!

The ruler of Carchemish sent troops to assist Ugarit, but Ugarit had already been sacked. Letter RS 19.011 (KTU 2.61) sent from Ugarit following the devastation read:

To Ž[?]rdn, my lord, say: thy messenger arrived. The degraded one trembles, and the low one is torn to pieces. Our food in the threshing floors is sacked and the vineyards are also destroyed. Our city is sacked, and may you know it!

This quote is frequently interpreted as "the degraded one", referring to the army being humiliated, destroyed, or both. The letter is also quoted with the final statement "Mayst thou know it"/"May you know it" repeated twice for effect in several later sources, while no such repetition appears to occur in the original.

The destruction levels of Ugarit contained Late Helladic IIIB ware, but none dating from LH IIIC (see Mycenaean Greece). Therefore, the date of the destruction is important for the dating of the LH IIIC phase. Since an Egyptian sword bearing the name of Pharaoh Merneptah was found in the destruction levels, 1190 BC was selected as the date for the beginning of the LH IIIC. A cuneiform tablet found in 1986 shows that Ugarit was destroyed after the death of Merneptah. It is generally agreed that Ugarit had already been destroyed by 1178 BC, which was the eighth ruling year of Ramesses III. Letters on clay tablets excavated from the site speak of an attack from the sea, and a letter from Alashiya (Cyprus) speaks of cities already having been destroyed by attackers who came by sea.

There is clear evidence that Ugarit was destroyed in some kind of assault, though the exact assailant is not known. In one residential area called the Ville sud, thirty-two arrowheads were found scattered throughout the area. Twelve of these arrowheads were found on the streets and in open spaces. Along with the arrowheads, two lance heads, four javelin heads, five bronze daggers, one bronze sword, and three bronze pieces of armor were scattered throughout the houses and streets, indicating that a fight occurred. An additional twenty-five arrowheads were also found scattered around the city centre. All of the recovered weaponry suggests the city was ruined by an assault, not by an earthquake. At the city of Emar on the Euphrates, at some time between 1187 and 1175, only the monumental and religious structures were targeted for destruction. The houses, on the other hand, appear to have been emptied, abandoned, and left intact. This particular scenario suggests that Emar was burned by attackers, despite the lack of weapons at the site.

While certain cities such as Ugarit and Emar were destroyed at the end of the Late Bronze Age, there are several others which were not destroyed, even though they erroneously appear on most maps of destruction at the end of the Late Bronze Age. No evidence of destruction has been found at Hama, Qatna, Kadesh, Alalakh, and Aleppo, while for Tell Sukas archaeologists only found some minor burning on some floors, likely indicating that the town was not burned to the ground around 1200 BC.

The West Semitic Arameans eventually superseded the earlier Amorites and people of Ugarit. Although the Arameans, Phoenicians, and Syro-Hittite states dominated the region demographically, the Middle Assyrian Empire conquered the Levant and held political and military control until withdrawing in the late 11th century BC, though Assyrian military campaigns in the area persisted. However, with the rise of the Neo-Assyrian Empire in the late 10th century BC, the entire region once again fell to Assyria.

These sites in Syria show evidence of the collapse: Alalakh, Aleppo, Emar, Hama, Kadesh, Qatna, Tell Sukas, and Ugarit.

== Possible causes ==
Various mutually compatible explanations for the collapse have been proposed, including climatic changes, migratory invasions by groups such as the Sea Peoples, the spread of iron metallurgy, military developments, and a range of political, social and economic systems failures, but none have achieved consensus. Earthquakes have also been proposed as causal, but recent research suggests that earthquakes were not as influential as previously believed. It is likely that a combination of several factors is responsible.

General systems collapse theory, pioneered by Joseph Tainter, proposes that societal collapse results from an increase in social complexity beyond a sustainable level, leading people to revert to simpler ways of life. The growing complexity and specialization of the Late Bronze Age political, economic, and social organization made the organization of civilization too intricate to reestablish once seriously disrupted. The critical flaws of the Late Bronze Age (its centralization, specialization, complexity, and top-heavy political structure) were exposed by sociopolitical events (revolt of peasantry and defection of mercenaries), fragility of all kingdoms (Mycenaean, Hittite, Ugaritic, and Egyptian), demographic crises (overpopulation), and wars between states. Other factors that could have placed increasing pressure on the fragile kingdoms include piracy by the Sea Peoples interrupting maritime trade, as well as drought, crop failure and famine.

=== Drought ===
A diversion of midwinter storms from the Atlantic to north of the Pyrenees and the Alps brought wetter conditions to Central Europe and drought to the Eastern Mediterranean near the time of the Late Bronze Age collapse. During what may have been the driest era of the Late Bronze Age, tree cover of the Mediterranean forest dwindled. Juniper tree ring measurements in the Anatolia region demonstrate a severe dry period from c. 1198 to c. 1196 BC. In the Dead Sea region (the southern Levant), the subsurface water level dropped by more than 50 metres (160 ft) during the end of the second millennium BC. According to the geography of that region, for water levels to drop so drastically the amount of rain the surrounding mountains received would have been dismal. Using the Palmer Drought Index across 35 weather stations in Greece, Turkey, and the Middle East, researchers found that a prolonged drought comparable to the one starting in January 1972 AD would have impacted every site linked to the Late Bronze Age collapse.

Alternatively, changes at the end of the Bronze Age could be better characterized as a 'gear shift' in Mediterranean climate rather than an event of three years. The long-range shift in precipitation would not have been a crisis event, but rather a continual stress put on societies in the region over several generations. There was no one year where conditions became untenable, "nor one straw that broke the back of the camel".

Analysis of multiple lines of paleoenvironmental evidence suggests climate change was one aspect associated with this period, but not the sole cause. This was also the conclusion reached by Knapp and Manning in 2016 who concluded that, "Based on a series of proxy indicators, there is clearly some sort of shift to cooler and more arid and unstable conditions generally between the 13th and 10th centuries BC, but not necessarily any one key 'episode'; thus, there is a context for change but not necessarily its only or specific cause." Moreover, Karakaya and Riehl's recent study of ancient plant remains from Syria showed little evidence that plants underwent water stress during the Late Bronze Age to Iron Age transition. As they summarize their research, "The emerging picture as concerns plant subsistence is that there is no clear evidence that the Late Bronze Age and the Iron Age were periods of dearth and widespread famine, as some climate models have presupposed." A 2012 study suggested a rapid regional drop of 3–4 degrees Celsius in the Mediterranean and Middle East from the start of the collapse to the end of the Greek Dark Ages based on measurements of nearby sea surface temperatures and changes in marine plankton. Northern Hemisphere temperatures skyrocketed and precipitously plummeted during the collapse (a rapid rise of approximately 0.2 degrees Celsius during the first 10 years, followed by a decrease of 0.2 degrees in the next 40 years), and temperatures continued declining to their lowest levels (3–4 degrees Celsius of cooling) during the Greek Dark Ages before slowly increasing to the Roman Warm Period. There were rapid changes in photosynthetic plankton during the collapse. The study provides evidence of rapid precipitation loss during the collapse from the paleoclimate record.

=== Ironworking ===
The Bronze Age collapse may be seen in the context of a technological history that saw the slow spread of ironworking technology from present-day Bulgaria and Romania in the 13th and the 12th centuries BC. Leonard R. Palmer suggested that iron, which is superior to bronze for weapons manufacturing, was in more plentiful supply and so allowed larger armies of iron users to overwhelm the smaller bronze-equipped armies that consisted largely of Maryannu chariotry. Patrick R. Fitsimmons uses statistics to hypothesise that access to iron reduced elite power relative to non-elites, leading to increased political fragmentation.

=== Migratory invasions ===
Primary sources report that the era was marked by large-scale migration of people at the end of the Late Bronze Age. Drought in the Nile Valley also may have contributed to the rise of the Sea Peoples and their sudden migration across the eastern Mediterranean. It was suspected that crop failures, famine and the population reduction that resulted from the lackluster flow of the Nile and the migration of the Sea Peoples led to New Kingdom Egypt falling into political instability at the end of the Late Bronze Age and well into the Iron Age. A general systems collapse has been put forward as an explanation for the reversals in culture that occurred between the Urnfield culture of the 13th and 12th centuries BC and the rise of the Celtic Hallstatt culture in the 10th and 9th centuries BC.

=== Pandemic ===
Recent evidence suggests the collapse of the cultures in Mycenaean Greece, Hittite Anatolia, and the Levant may have been precipitated or worsened by the arrival of an early and now-extinct strain of the bubonic plague brought from central Asia by the Sea Peoples or other migrating groups.

=== Volcanoes ===
Some Egyptologists have dated the Hekla 3 volcanic eruption in Iceland to 1159 BC and blamed it for famines under Ramesses III during the wider Bronze Age collapse. The event is thought to have caused a volcanic winter. Other estimated dates for the Hekla 3 eruption range from 1021 (±130) to 1135 BC (±130) and 929 (±34). Other scholars estimate the date as "3000 BP".

=== Warfare ===
Robert Drews argues for the appearance of massed infantry, using newly developed weapons and armour, such as cast rather than forged spearheads and long swords, a revolutionizing cut-and-thrust weapon, and javelins. The appearance of bronze foundries suggests "that mass production of bronze artefacts was suddenly important in the Aegean". For example, Homer uses "spears" as a metonym for "warriors".

Such new weaponry, in the hands of large numbers of "running skirmishers", who could swarm and cut down a chariot army, would destabilize states that were based upon the use of chariots by the ruling class. That would precipitate an abrupt social collapse as raiders began to conquer, loot and burn cities.

== Aftermath ==
Robert Drews described the collapse as "arguably the worst disaster in ancient history, even more calamitous than the collapse of the Western Roman Empire". Cultural memories of the disaster told of a "lost golden age". For example, Hesiod spoke of Ages of Gold, Silver, and Bronze, separated from the cruel modern Age of Iron by the Age of Heroes. Rodney Castleden suggests that memories of the Bronze Age collapse influenced Plato's story of Atlantis in Timaeus and the Critias.

Only a few powerful states survived the Bronze Age collapse, particularly Assyria (albeit temporarily weakened), the New Kingdom of Egypt (also weakened), the Phoenician city-states and Elam. Even among these comparative survivors, success was mixed. By the end of the 12th century BC, Elam waned after its defeat by Nebuchadnezzar I, who briefly revived Babylonian fortunes before suffering a series of defeats by the Assyrians. After the death of Ashur-bel-kala in 1056 BC, Assyria declined for a century. Its empire shrank significantly by 1020 BC, apparently leaving it in control only of the areas in its immediate vicinity, although its heartland remained well-defended. By the time of Wenamun, Phoenicia had regained independence from Egypt.

Gradually, by the end of the ensuing Dark Age, remnants of the Hittites coalesced into small Syro-Hittite states in Cilicia and in the Levant, where the new states were composed of mixed Hittite and Aramean polities. Beginning in the mid-10th century BC, a series of small Aramean kingdoms formed in the Levant, and the Philistines settled in southern Canaan, where Canaanite speakers had coalesced into a number of polities such as Israel, Moab, Edom and Ammon.

== See also ==
- Iron Age Cold Epoch
- Middle Bronze Age migrations (ancient Near East)
- Migration Period – similar period preceding the Early Middle Ages
- Mycenology
- Third Intermediate Period of Egypt – a similar period in Egypt
- Late Harappan period, Indo-Aryan migrations – events and periods connected to the end of the Bronze Age India
- Israelite highland settlement, a process during the same period in Canaan

== Sources ==
- Cline, Eric H. (2014). 1177 B.C.: The Year Civilization Collapsed. Princeton University Press. ISBN 978-0-691-14089-6.
- Drews, Robert (1993). The End of the Bronze Age: Changes in Warfare and the Catastrophe ca. 1200 B.C. Princeton University Press. ISBN 978-0-691-04811-6.
- Millek, Jesse Michael (2019). Exchange, Destruction, and a Transitioning Society: Interregional Exchange in the Southern Levant from the Late Bronze Age to the Iron I. Tübingen University Press. ISBN 978-3-947251-11-7.
- Millek, Jesse Michael (2019). "Destruction at the end of the Late Bronze Age in Syria: A reassessment". Studia Eblaitica. 5: 157–190. doi:10.13173/STEBLA/2019/1/157. ISBN 978-3-447-11300-7. S2CID 259490258.
- Millek, Jesse Michael (2021). "Just what did they destroy? The Sea Peoples and the end of the Late Bronze Age". In Kamlah, J.; Lichtenberger, A. (eds.). The Mediterranean Sea and the Southern Levant: archaeological and historical perspectives from the Bronze Age to Medieval times. Wiesbaden: Harrassowitz Verlag. pp. 59–98. ISBN 978-3-447-11742-5.
