= Eric H. Cline =

American historian (born 1960)

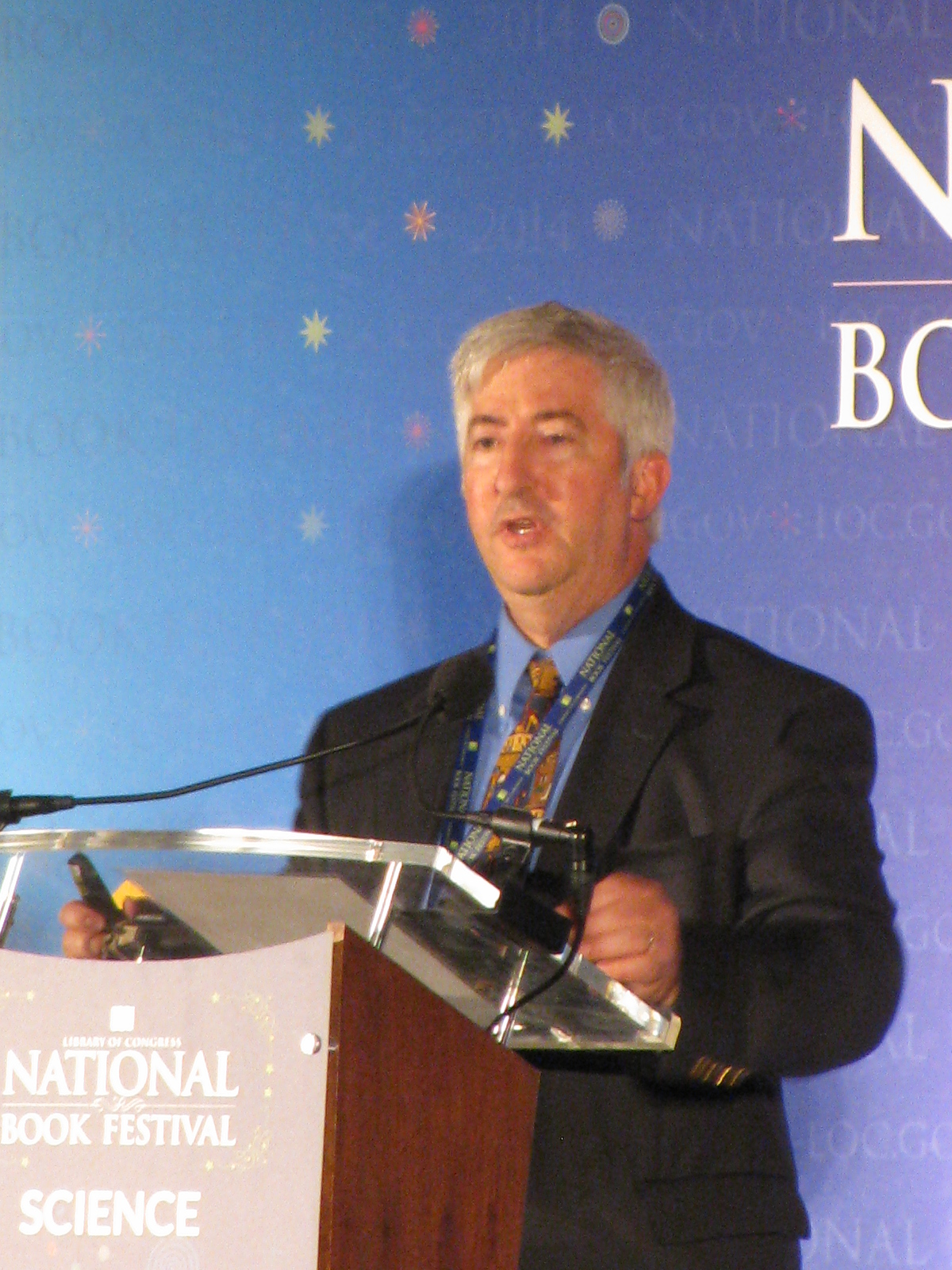
- Cline speaking at the 2014 National Book Festival
- Born: September 1, 1960 (age 66)
- Education: Dartmouth College; Yale University; University of Pennsylvania
- Known for: Excavations and field work at Tel Megiddo and Tel Kabri
- Scientific career
- Fields: Archaeology
- Workplaces: George Washington University
- Website: cnelc.columbian.gwu.edu/eric-h-cline

Eric H. Cline (born September 1, 1960) is an American author, historian, archaeologist, and professor of ancient history and archaeology at The George Washington University (GWU) in Washington, D.C., where he is a Professor of Classics and Anthropology and the former Chair of the Department of Classical and Near Eastern Languages and Civilizations, as well as Director of the GWU Capitol Archaeological Institute. He is also the advisor for the undergraduate archaeology majors, for which he was awarded the GWU Award for "Excellence in Undergraduate Departmental Advising" (2006). Cline served as co-editor of the Bulletin of the American Schools of Oriental Research along with Christopher Rollston from 2014 to 2020.

== Background ==
Cline received his B.A. in Classical Archaeology at Dartmouth College in 1982 and his M.A. in Near Eastern Languages and Literatures at Yale University in 1984.

He was awarded a Fulbright scholarship (Greece) in 1989 and in 1991 received his Ph.D. in Ancient History from the University of Pennsylvania.

He has served as a Trustee and Board Member (in addition to holding various other offices) for both the Archaeological Institute of America and the American Schools of Oriental Research.

== Field work ==
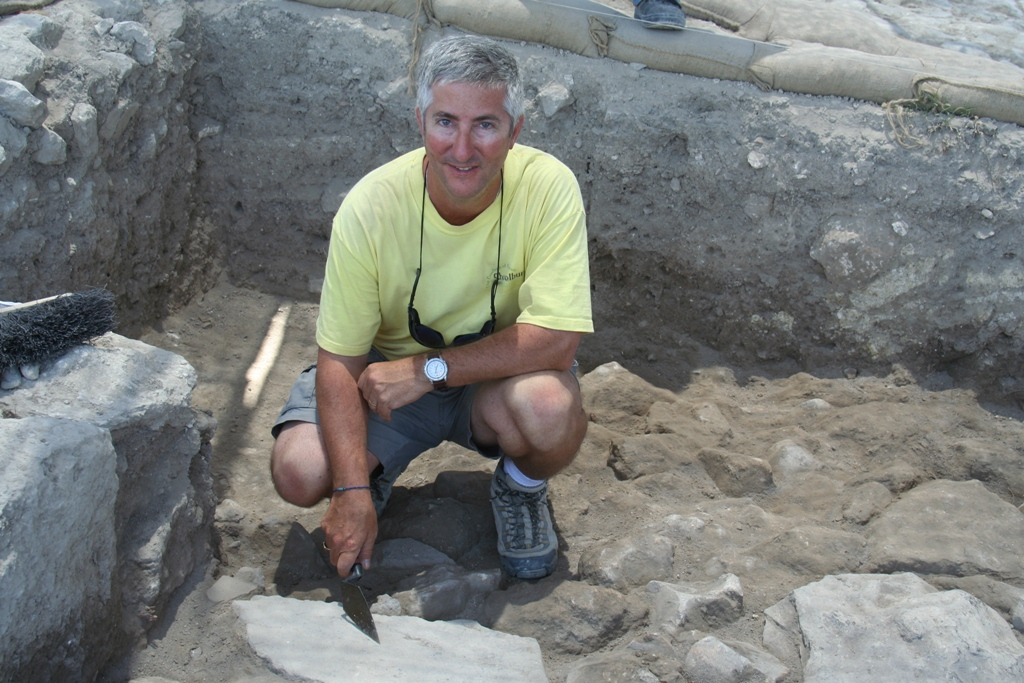
Excavating at Megiddo

Cline is an active field archaeologist with more than 30 seasons of excavation and survey experience in Israel, Egypt, Jordan, Cyprus, Greece, Crete, and the United States, including ten seasons at the site of Megiddo (biblical Armageddon) in Israel, from which he has retired after serving as co-director with Israel Finkelstein of Tel Aviv University. He is currently co-director, with Assaf Yasur-Landau of the University of Haifa, of the renewed excavations at Tel Kabri, Israel, which have been conducted since 2005. Discoveries by Cline and his team include the Near East's oldest wine cellar.

== Selected awards and recognition ==
Cline has won awards for his books six times—he is a two-time winner of the American Schools of Oriental Research "Nancy Lapp Popular Book Award" (2014 and 2018) and a three-time winner of the Biblical Archaeology Society's "Best Popular Book on Archaeology" Award (2001, 2009, and 2011); in addition, a volume that he co-edited won the 2019 G. Ernest Wright Award from the American Schools of Oriental Research. He has also won both national and local teaching awards, including the national "Excellence in Undergraduate Teaching" Award from the Archaeological Institute of America (2005) and the GWU "Morton Bender Excellence in Undergraduate Teaching" Award (2004). In addition, he has received the two highest awards given at GWU: one for teaching, the "Oscar and Shoshana Trachtenberg Award for Teaching Excellence" (2012), and the other for scholarly research, the "Oscar and Shoshana Trachtenberg Award for Faculty Scholarship" (2011). He is the first faculty member in GWU history to have won both awards. Most recently, in 2024 he received the GWU OVPR Distinguished Career Award. He has also been nominated three times for the CASE US Professor of the Year (2008, 2009, and 2012). In May 2015, he was awarded an honorary doctorate from Muhlenberg College. In July 2015, he was named a member of the inaugural class of NEH Public Scholars, receiving the award for his book project entitled Digging Up Armageddon: The Search for the Lost City of Solomon, which was published by Princeton University Press in March 2020. In Fall 2018, Cline was named an honorary member of the world's first Archaeology fraternity, Delta Iota Gamma ("DIG"). Cline was named a Getty Scholar for the 2020–21 academic year, but postponed until Fall 2021 because of the pandemic.

== Selected publications (books) ==
Cline is the author or editor of more than 20 books. Many have been translated, into a total of 19 languages, including French, German, Italian, Dutch, Spanish, Portuguese, Greek, Arabic, Turkish, Korean, Chinese (both Simplified and Traditional), Japanese, Russian, Czech, Serbian, Bulgarian, Polish, and Hungarian. His books include:

- Sailing the Wine-Dark Sea: International Trade and the Late Bronze Age Aegean (1994; reprinted 2009), ISBN 0-86054-765-5
- The Aegean and the Orient in the Second Millennium. Proceedings of the 50th Anniversary Symposium, Cincinnati, 18–20 April 1997 (1998), edited with Diane Harris-Cline (out of print, but available for free download)
- Amenhotep III: Perspectives on His Reign (1998), edited with David B. O'Connor, ISBN 0-472-10742-9
- The Battles of Armageddon: Megiddo and the Jezreel Valley from the Bronze Age to the Nuclear Age (2000), ISBN 0-472-09739-3 (Winner, 2001 Biblical Archaeology Society "Best Popular Book on Archaeology")
- Jerusalem Besieged: From Ancient Canaan to Modern Israel (2004), ISBN 0-472-11313-5
- The Ancient Egyptian World (2005), written with Jill Rubalcaba, ISBN 978-0-19-517391-8
- Thutmose III: A New Biography (2006), edited with David B. O'Connor, ISBN 978-0472114672.
- From Eden to Exile: Unraveling Mysteries of the Bible (2007), ISBN 1-4262-0084-6 (Winner, 2009 Biblical Archaeology Society "Best Popular Book on Archaeology")
- Biblical Archaeology: A Very Short Introduction (2009), ISBN 0-19-534263-1 (Winner, 2011 Biblical Archaeology Society "Best Popular Book on Archaeology")
- The Oxford Handbook of the Bronze Age Aegean (2010), ISBN 978-0-19-536550-4
- Digging for Troy: From Homer to Hisarlik (2011), written with Jill Rubalcaba, ISBN 978-1-58089-327-5
- Ancient Empires: Formation and Resistance in the Near Eastern, Greco-Roman, and Early Muslim Worlds (2011), written with Mark W. Graham, ISBN 0-521-71780-9
- The Ahhiyawa Texts (2011), written with Gary Beckman and Trevor Bryce, ISBN 1-58983-268-X
- Ramesses III: The Life and Times of Egypt’s Last Hero (2012), edited with David B. O'Connor, ISBN 0-472-11760-2
- The Trojan War: A Very Short Introduction (2013), ISBN 0-199-76027-6, 978-0199760275
- Three Stones Make a Wall: The Story of Archaeology (2017), ISBN 978-0691183237 (Winner, 2018 ASOR “Nancy Lapp Best Popular Book” Award)
- The Social Archaeology of the Levant: From Prehistory to the Present (2019), co-edited with Assaf Yasur-Landu and Yorke Rowan, ISBN 978-1107156685 (Winner, 2019 ASOR “G. Ernest Wright” Award)
- Digging Up Armageddon: The Search for the Lost City of Solomon (2020), ISBN 978-0691166322
- Digging Deeper: How Archaeology Works (2020), ISBN 978-0691208572
- 1177 B.C.: The Year Civilization Collapsed, revised and updated edition (2021), ISBN 978-0691208015; first edition (2014), ISBN 978-0-691-14089-6, (Winner, 2014 ASOR "Nancy Lapp Best Popular Book" Award)
- 1177 B.C.: A Graphic History of the Year Civilization Collapsed (2024), co-authored with Glynnis Fawkes ISBN 978-0691213026
- After 1177 B.C.: The Survival of Civilizations (2024), ISBN 978-0691192130
- Love, War, and Diplomacy: The Discovery of the Amarna Letters and the Bronze Age World They Revealed (2025), ISBN 978-0691274089

== Television appearances ==
Cline has appeared in numerous television documentaries for ABC News, the National Geographic Channel, the Discovery Channel, the BBC, PBS, and the History Channel.

- Back to the Beginning with Christiane Amanpour (ABC News): Garden of Eden, Biblical Noah's Ark Replica Sails in the Netherlands, Searching for Noah's Ark, Joshua and Conquest of Canaan, David, the Bible's First Real Hero, Search for the Ark of the Covenant
- King Solomon's Mines (National Geographic Channel)
- Biblical Plagues (National Geographic Channel)
- Jerusalem: Center of the World (PBS)
- Countdown to Armageddon (History Channel)
- Mysteries/Science of the Bible (National Geographic Channel): Ark of the Covenant, Exodus Revealed, Lost Cities, Secrets of Revelation, Noah's Ark, and Lost Kings of the Bible (David and Solomon)
- Secrets of the Aegean Apocalypse (Mystery of the Sea Peoples) (History Channel)
- Is It Real: Atlantis (National Geographic Channel)
- The Truth of Troy (BBC)
- Joshua and the Battle of Jericho (Discovery Channel)
- Time Titans (Pilot Episode, did not air) (History Channel)
- Lost Cities of the Trojans (PBS)
