= 79 BC =

79 BC in various calendars
- Gregorian calendar: 79 BC; LXXIX BC
- Ab urbe condita: 675
- Ancient Egypt era: XXXIII dynasty, 245
- Pharaoh: Ptolemy XII Auletes, 2
- Ancient Greek Olympiad (summer): 175th Olympiad, year 2
- Assyrian calendar: 4672
- Balinese saka calendar: N/A
- Bengali calendar: −672 – −671
- Berber calendar: 872
- Buddhist calendar: 466
- Burmese calendar: −716
- Byzantine calendar: 5430–5431
- Chinese calendar: 辛丑年 (Metal Ox); 2619 or 2412 — to — 壬寅年 (Water Tiger); 2620 or 2413
- Coptic calendar: −362 – −361
- Discordian calendar: 1088
- Ethiopian calendar: −86 – −85
- Hebrew calendar: 3682–3683
- Hindu calendars
- Vikram Samvat: −22 – −21
- Shaka Samvat: N/A
- Kali Yuga: 3022–3023
- Holocene calendar: 9922
- Iranian calendar: 700 BP – 699 BP
- Islamic calendar: 722 BH – 720 BH
- Javanese calendar: N/A
- Julian calendar: N/A
- Korean calendar: 2255
- Minguo calendar: 1990 before ROC 民前1990年
- Nanakshahi calendar: −1546
- Seleucid era: 233/234 AG
- Thai solar calendar: 464–465
- Tibetan calendar: ལྕགས་མོ་གླང་ལོ་ (female Iron-Ox); 48 or −333 or −1105 — to — ཆུ་ཕོ་སྟག་ལོ་ (male Water-Tiger); 49 or −332 or −1104

Year 79 BC was a year of the pre-Julian Roman calendar. At the time it was known as the Year of the Consulship of Vatia Isauricus and Claudius Pulcher (or, less frequently, year 675 Ab urbe condita). The denomination 79 BC for this year has been used since the early medieval period, when the Anno Domini calendar era became the prevalent method in Europe for naming years.

== Events ==
=== By place ===
==== Roman republic ====
- Sulla renounces his dictatorship.
- Cicero travels to Athens and then to Rhodes to continue his studies of philosophy and oratory.

== Deaths ==
- Sulla dies in Campania
