= Earth Goat =

56th combination of the sexagenary cycle

Chinese name
- Chinese: 己未
Transcriptions
Standard Mandarin
- Hanyu Pinyin: jǐwèi

Vietnamese name
- Vietnamese alphabet: Kỷ Mùi
- Chữ Hán: 己未

South Korean name
- Hangul: 기미
- Hanja: 己未
Transcriptions
- Revised Romanization: gimi

Japanese name
- Kanji: 己未
- Kana: つちのとひつじ きび
Transcriptions
- Romanization: tsuchinotohitsuji kibi

Sexagenary cycle
01; Wood Rat	02; Wood Ox	03; Fire Tiger	04; Fire Rabbit	05; Earth Dragon	06; Earth Snake
07; Metal Horse	08; Metal Goat	09; Water Monkey	10; Water Rooster	11; Wood Dog	12; Wood Pig
13; Fire Rat	14; Fire Ox	15; Earth Tiger	16; Earth Rabbit	17; Metal Dragon	18; Metal Snake
19; Water Horse	20; Water Goat	21; Wood Monkey	22; Wood Rooster	23; Fire Dog	24; Fire Pig
25; Earth Rat	26; Earth Ox	27; Metal Tiger	28; Metal Rabbit	29; Water Dragon	30; Water Snake
31; Wood Horse	32; Wood Goat	33; Fire Monkey	34; Fire Rooster	35; Earth Dog	36; Earth Pig
37; Metal Rat	38; Metal Ox	39; Water Tiger	40; Water Rabbit	41; Wood Dragon	42; Wood Snake
43; Fire Horse	44; Fire Goat	45; Earth Monkey	46; Earth Rooster	47; Metal Dog	48; Metal Pig
49; Water Rat	50; Water Ox	51; Wood Tiger	52; Wood Rabbit	53; Fire Dragon	54; Fire Snake
55; Earth Horse	56; Earth Goat	57; Metal Monkey	58; Metal Rooster	59; Water Dog	60; Water Pig

Heavenly Stems ・ Earthly Branches

Earth Goat (Chinese: 己未; pinyin: jǐwèi) is the 56th combination of the sexagenary cycle of the Chinese zodiac. It is preceded by Earth Horse and followed by Metal Monkey. In the traditional correspondence of the Heavenly Stems with the Five Phases, jǐ (己) represents yin and Earth, while the Earthly Branch wèi (未) corresponds to the Goat zodiac.

== Earth Goat years ==
A year of the Earth Goat occurs every 60 years according to the following table:

1st millennium	2nd millennium	3rd millennium	4th millennium
59; 119; 179; 239; 299; 359; 419; 479; 539; 599; 659; 719; 779; 839; 899; 959	1019; 1079; 1139; 1199; 1259; 1319; 1379; 1439; 1499; 1559; 1619; 1679; 1739; 1799; 1859; 1919; 1979	2039; 2099; 2159; 2219; 2279; 2339; 2399; 2459; 2519; 2579; 2639; 2699; 2759; 2819; 2879; 2939; 2999	3059; 3119; 3179; 3239; 3299; 3359; 3419; 3479; 3539; 3599; 3659; 3719; 3779; 3839; 3899; 3959

== Earth Goat months ==
When months are numbered using the sexagenary cycle, the sixth month of a year whose heavenly stem is 戊 (wù) or 癸 (guǐ) is a Earth Goat month.

== Earth Goat days ==
A Earth Goat day occurs every 60 days according to the following table:

2023	2024	2025	2026	2027	2028	2029
1 January; 2 March; 1 May; 30 June; 29 August; 28 October; 27 December	25 February; 25 April; 24 June; 23 August; 22 October; 21 December	19 February; 20 April; 19 June; 18 August; 17 October; 16 December	14 February; 15 April; 14 June; 13 August; 12 October; 11 December	9 February; 10 April; 9 June; 8 August; 7 October; 6 December	4 February; 4 April; 3 June; 2 August; 1 October; 30 November	29 January; 30 March; 29 May; 28 July; 26 September; 25 November
