= AD 81 =

AD 81 in various calendars
- Gregorian calendar: AD 81; LXXXI
- Ab urbe condita: 834
- Assyrian calendar: 4831
- Balinese saka calendar: 2–3
- Bengali calendar: −513 – −512
- Berber calendar: 1031
- Buddhist calendar: 625
- Burmese calendar: −557
- Byzantine calendar: 5589–5590
- Chinese calendar: 庚辰年 (Metal Dragon); 2778 or 2571 — to — 辛巳年 (Metal Snake); 2779 or 2572
- Coptic calendar: −203 – −202
- Discordian calendar: 1247
- Ethiopian calendar: 73–74
- Hebrew calendar: 3841–3842
- Hindu calendars
- Vikram Samvat: 137–138
- Shaka Samvat: 2–3
- Kali Yuga: 3181–3182
- Holocene calendar: 10081
- Iranian calendar: 541 BP – 540 BP
- Islamic calendar: 558 BH – 557 BH
- Javanese calendar: N/A
- Julian calendar: AD 81; LXXXI
- Korean calendar: 2414
- Minguo calendar: 1831 before ROC 民前1831年
- Nanakshahi calendar: −1387
- Seleucid era: 392/393 AG
- Thai solar calendar: 623–624
- Tibetan calendar: ལྕགས་ཕོ་འབྲུག་ལོ་ (male Iron-Dragon); 207 or −174 or −946 — to — ལྕགས་མོ་སྦྲུལ་ལོ་ (female Iron-Snake); 208 or −173 or −945

A.D. 81 (LXXXI) was a common year starting on Monday of the Julian calendar. At the time, it was known as the Year of the Consulship of Silva and Pollio (or, less frequently, year 834 Ab urbe condita). The denomination A.D. 81 for this year has been used since the early medieval period, when the Anno Domini calendar era became the prevalent method in Europe for naming years.

== Events ==
=== By place ===
==== Roman Empire ====
- September 14 – Domitian succeeds his brother Titus as emperor. Domitian is not a soldier like his two predecessors, and his administration is directed towards the reinforcement of a monarchy. By taking the title of Dominus ("lord"), he scandalizes the senatorial aristocracy. Romanisation progresses in the provinces, and life in the cities is greatly improved. Many provincials – Spanish, Gallic, and African – become Senators.
- The Arch of Titus is constructed.
- Pliny the Younger is flamen Divi Augusti (priest in the cult of the Emperor).

=== By topic ===
==== Commerce ====
- The silver content of the Roman denarius rises to 92% under emperor Domitian, up from 81% in the reign of Vitellius.

==== Religion ====
- Possible date of the First Epistle of Peter.

== Births ==
- Deng Sui, Chinese empress of the Han dynasty (d. 121)

== Deaths ==
- September 13 – Titus, Roman emperor (b. AD 39)
- Artabanus III, king of the Parthian Empire
