= Water Rat (Chinese Zodiac) =

49th combination of the sexagenary cycle

Chinese name
- Chinese: 壬子
Transcriptions
Standard Mandarin
- Hanyu Pinyin: rénzǐ

Vietnamese name
- Vietnamese alphabet: Nhâm Tý
- Chữ Hán: 壬子

South Korean name
- Hangul: 임자
- Hanja: 壬子
Transcriptions
- Revised Romanization: imja

Japanese name
- Kanji: 壬子
- Kana: みずのえね じんし
Transcriptions
- Romanization: mizunoene jinshi

Sexagenary cycle
| 01; Wood Rat | 02; Wood Ox | 03; Fire Tiger | 04; Fire Rabbit | 05; Earth Dragon | 06; Earth Snake |
| 07; Metal Horse | 08; Metal Goat | 09; Water Monkey | 10; Water Rooster | 11; Wood Dog | 12; Wood Pig |
| 13; Fire Rat | 14; Fire Ox | 15; Earth Tiger | 16; Earth Rabbit | 17; Metal Dragon | 18; Metal Snake |
| 19; Water Horse | 20; Water Goat | 21; Wood Monkey | 22; Wood Rooster | 23; Fire Dog | 24; Fire Pig |
| 25; Earth Rat | 26; Earth Ox | 27; Metal Tiger | 28; Metal Rabbit | 29; Water Dragon | 30; Water Snake |
| 31; Wood Horse | 32; Wood Goat | 33; Fire Monkey | 34; Fire Rooster | 35; Earth Dog | 36; Earth Pig |
| 37; Metal Rat | 38; Metal Ox | 39; Water Tiger | 40; Water Rabbit | 41; Wood Dragon | 42; Wood Snake |
| 43; Fire Horse | 44; Fire Goat | 45; Earth Monkey | 46; Earth Rooster | 47; Metal Dog | 48; Metal Pig |
| 49; Water Rat | 50; Water Ox | 51; Wood Tiger | 52; Wood Rabbit | 53; Fire Dragon | 54; Fire Snake |
| 55; Earth Horse | 56; Earth Goat | 57; Metal Monkey | 58; Metal Rooster | 59; Water Dog | 60; Water Pig |

Heavenly Stems ・ Earthly Branches

Water Rat (Chinese: 壬子; pinyin: rénzǐ) is the 49th combination of the sexagenary cycle of the Chinese zodiac. It is preceded by Metal Pig and followed by Water Ox. In the traditional correspondence of the Heavenly Stems with the Five Phases, rén (壬) represents yang and Water, while the Earthly Branch zǐ (子) corresponds to the Rat zodiac.

== Water Rat years ==
A year of the Water Rat occurs every 60 years according to the following table:

| 1st millennium | 2nd millennium | 3rd millennium | 4th millennium |
|---|---|---|---|
| 52; 112; 172; 232; 292; 352; 412; 472; 532; 592; 652; 712; 772; 832; 892; 952 | 1012; 1072; 1132; 1192; 1252; 1312; 1372; 1432; 1492; 1552; 1612; 1672; 1732; 1792; 1852; 1912; 1972 | 2032; 2092; 2152; 2212; 2272; 2332; 2392; 2452; 2512; 2572; 2632; 2692; 2752; 2812; 2872; 2932; 2992 | 3052; 3112; 3172; 3232; 3292; 3352; 3412; 3472; 3532; 3592; 3652; 3712; 3772; 3832; 3892; 3952 |

== Water Rat months ==
When months are numbered using the sexagenary cycle, the eleventh month of a year whose heavenly stem is 丁 (dīng) or 壬 (rén) is a Water Rat month.

== Water Rat days ==
A Water Rat day occurs every 60 days according to the following table:

| 2023 | 2024 | 2025 | 2026 | 2027 | 2028 | 2029 |
|---|---|---|---|---|---|---|
| 23 February; 24 April; 23 June; 22 August; 21 October; 20 December | 18 February; 18 April; 17 June; 16 August; 15 October; 14 December | 12 February; 13 April; 12 June; 11 August; 10 October; 9 December | 7 February; 8 April; 7 June; 6 August; 5 October; 4 December | 2 February; 3 April; 2 June; 1 August; 30 September; 29 November | 28 January; 28 March; 27 May; 26 July; 24 September; 23 November | 22 January; 23 March; 22 May; 21 July; 19 September; 18 November |
