= AD 117 =

117 in various calendars
- Gregorian calendar: 117; CXVII
- Ab urbe condita: 870
- Assyrian calendar: 4867
- Balinese saka calendar: 38–39
- Bengali calendar: −477 – −476
- Berber calendar: 1067
- Buddhist calendar: 661
- Burmese calendar: −521
- Byzantine calendar: 5625–5626
- Chinese calendar: 丙辰年 (Fire Dragon); 2814 or 2607 — to — 丁巳年 (Fire Snake); 2815 or 2608
- Coptic calendar: −167 – −166
- Discordian calendar: 1283
- Ethiopian calendar: 109–110
- Hebrew calendar: 3877–3878
- Hindu calendars
- Vikram Samvat: 173–174
- Shaka Samvat: 38–39
- Kali Yuga: 3217–3218
- Holocene calendar: 10117
- Iranian calendar: 505 BP – 504 BP
- Islamic calendar: 521 BH – 520 BH
- Javanese calendar: N/A
- Julian calendar: 117; CXVII
- Korean calendar: 2450
- Minguo calendar: 1795 before ROC 民前1795年
- Nanakshahi calendar: −1351
- Seleucid era: 428/429 AG
- Thai solar calendar: 659–660
- Tibetan calendar: མེ་ཕོ་འབྲུག་ལོ་ (male Fire-Dragon); 243 or −138 or −910 — to — མེ་མོ་སྦྲུལ་ལོ་ (female Fire-Snake); 244 or −137 or −909

The Roman Empire reaches its maximal extent between 116 and 117

Year 117 (CXVII) was a common year starting on Thursday of the Julian calendar. At the time, it was known as the Year of the Consulship of Niger and Apronianus (or, less frequently, year 870 Ab urbe condita). The denomination 117 for this year has been used since the early medieval period, when the Anno Domini calendar era became the prevalent method in Europe for naming years.

== Events ==
=== By place ===
==== Roman Empire ====
- Emperor Trajan falls seriously ill and dies of a stroke at Selinus in Cilicia, age 63, while en route from Mesopotamia to Italy, leaving the Roman Empire at its maximal territorial extent.
- On his death bed, Trajan allegedly adopts Hadrian, a fellow Spaniard, and designates him as his successor. Hadrian will reign until 138.
- The Jewish Diaspora Revolt is quelled, likely by autumn 117, though unrest may have persisted in Egypt until early 118. Its suppression results in the near-complete expulsion of Jews from Cyrenaica, Cyprus, and several regions of Egypt.
- Hadrian returns large parts of Mesopotamia to the Parthians as part of a peace settlement. He inaugurates a policy of retrenchment and cultural integration, giving up the policy of conquest of his predecessor in order to consolidate the empire.
- Construction begins on the Pantheon in Rome.

=== By topic ===
==== Commerce ====
- The silver content of the Roman denarius falls to 87 percent under emperor Hadrian, down from 93 percent in the reign of Trajan.

==== Religion ====
- John I becomes the 7th Bishop of Jerusalem.

== Births ==
- Aelius Aristides, Greek orator (d. 181)

== Deaths ==
- August 8 – Trajan, Roman emperor (b. AD 53)
- Gaius Cornelius Tacitus, Roman historian (b. AD 56)
- Gaius Julius Quadratus Bassus, Roman general in Judea (b. AD 70)
- Hermione of Ephesus, Maurus, Pantalemon and Sergius, Astius and several other Christian martyrs in persecution by Trajan
