= AD 181 =

181 in various calendars
- Gregorian calendar: 181; CLXXXI
- Ab urbe condita: 934
- Assyrian calendar: 4931
- Balinese saka calendar: 102–103
- Bengali calendar: −413 – −412
- Berber calendar: 1131
- Buddhist calendar: 725
- Burmese calendar: −457
- Byzantine calendar: 5689–5690
- Chinese calendar: 庚申年 (Metal Monkey); 2878 or 2671 — to — 辛酉年 (Metal Rooster); 2879 or 2672
- Coptic calendar: −103 – −102
- Discordian calendar: 1347
- Ethiopian calendar: 173–174
- Hebrew calendar: 3941–3942
- Hindu calendars
- Vikram Samvat: 237–238
- Shaka Samvat: 102–103
- Kali Yuga: 3281–3282
- Holocene calendar: 10181
- Iranian calendar: 441 BP – 440 BP
- Islamic calendar: 455 BH – 454 BH
- Javanese calendar: 57–58
- Julian calendar: 181; CLXXXI
- Korean calendar: 2514
- Minguo calendar: 1731 before ROC 民前1731年
- Nanakshahi calendar: −1287
- Seleucid era: 492/493 AG
- Thai solar calendar: 723–724
- Tibetan calendar: ལྕགས་ཕོ་སྤྲེ་ལོ་ (male Iron-Monkey); 307 or −74 or −846 — to — ལྕགས་མོ་བྱ་ལོ་ (female Iron-Bird); 308 or −73 or −845

Year 181 (CLXXXI) was a common year starting on Sunday of the Julian calendar. At the time, it was known as the Year of the Consulship of Aurelius and Burrus (or, less frequently, year 934 Ab urbe condita). The denomination 181 for this year has been used since the early medieval period, when the Anno Domini calendar era became the prevalent method in Europe for naming years.

== Events ==
=== By place ===
==== Roman Empire ====
- Imperator Lucius Aurelius Commodus and Lucius Antistius Burrus become Roman Consuls.
- The Antonine Wall is overrun by the Picts in Britannia (approximate date).

==== Asia ====
- Nanhai inspector Kong Zhi led thousands of residents to join Liang Long's rebellion against the Han dynasty.
- June: Liang Long is captured and beheaded, and his rebellion is suppressed by general Zhu Juan.

==== Oceania ====
- The volcano associated with Lake Taupō in New Zealand erupts, one of the largest on Earth in the last 5,000 years. The effects of this eruption are seen as far away as Rome and China.

== Births ==
- April 2 – Xian of Han, Chinese emperor (d. 234)
- Zhuge Liang, Chinese chancellor and regent (d. 234)

== Deaths ==
- Aelius Aristides, Greek orator and writer (b. 117)
- Cao Jie, Chinese court eunuch and official
