= Snake (zodiac) =

Sign of the Chinese zodiac

- "Snake" in regular Chinese characters
- Chinese: 蛇
Transcriptions
Standard Mandarin
- Hanyu Pinyin: shé
- Wade–Giles: shê^{2}
- IPA: [ʂɤ̌]
Hakka
- Romanization: sà
Yue: Cantonese
- Yale Romanization: sèh
- Jyutping: se4
- IPA: [sɛ˩]
Southern Min
- Hokkien POJ: siâ / chôa
Eastern Min
- Fuzhou BUC: siè
Northern Min
- Jian'ou Romanized: ṳê
Old Chinese
- Baxter (1992): *ljAj
- Baxter–Sagart (2014): *Cə.lAj

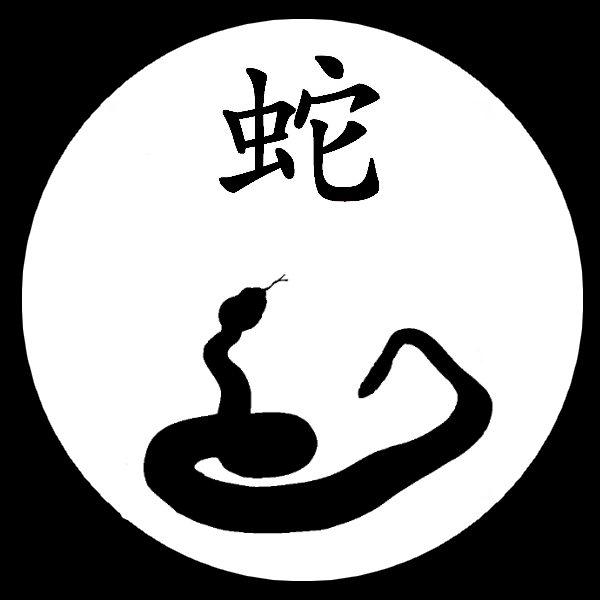
Zodiac snake, showing the shé (蛇) character for snake

The Snake (蛇) is the sixth of the twelve-year cycle of animals which appear in the Chinese zodiac related to the Chinese calendar. The Year of the Snake is associated with the Earthly Branch symbol 巳. Besides its use in the cycle of years, the zodiacal snake is otherwise used to also represent hours of the day. Snakes have a long and complicated place in Chinese mythology and culture.

== Other uses ==
The same twelve animals are also used to symbolize the cycle of hours in the day, each being associated with a two-hour time period. The hour of the snake is 9:00 to 11:00 a.m., the time when the Sun warms up the Earth, and snakes are said to slither out of their holes. The month of the snake is the 4th month of the Chinese lunar calendar and it usually falls within the months of May through June depending on the Chinese to Gregorian calendar conversion. The reason the animal signs are referred to as zodiacal is that one's personality is said to be influenced by the animal signs ruling the time of birth, together with elemental aspects of the animal signs within the sexagenary cycle. Similarly, the year governed by a particular animal sign is supposed to be characterized by it, with the effects particularly strong for people who were born in any year governed by the same animal sign.

== Symbology ==
In Chinese symbology, snakes are regarded as intelligent, with a tendency to lack scruples.

== Origin myth ==
According to one legend, there is a reason for the order of the animals in the cycle. A race was held to cross a great river, and the order of the animals in the cycle was based upon their order in finishing the race. In this story, the snake compensated for not being the best swimmer by hitching a hidden ride on the Horse's hoof. When the horse was about to cross the finish line, the snake jumped out, scaring the horse, and thus edging it out for sixth place.

== Years and elements ==
According to Chinese and related traditions, people born within the date ranges of the snake year have been said to have been born in the "Year of the Snake". Each snake year may traditionally be said to correspond with a cycle of five changes of Wuxing (Chinese philosophy), often translated as "elements". The following table lists dates for years of the snake together with the associated elemental signs:

Start date	End date	Heavenly branch
10 February 1929	29 January 1930	Earth Snake
27 January 1941	14 February 1942	Metal Snake
14 February 1953	2 February 1954	Water Snake
2 February 1965	20 January 1966	Wood Snake
18 February 1977	6 February 1978	Fire Snake
6 February 1989	26 January 1990	Earth Snake
24 January 2001	11 February 2002	Metal Snake
10 February 2013	30 January 2014	Water Snake
29 January 2025	16 February 2026	Wood Snake
15 February 2037	3 February 2038	Fire Snake
2 February 2049	22 January 2050	Earth Snake
21 January 2061	8 February 2062	Metal Snake
7 February 2073	26 January 2074	Water Snake
26 January 2085	13 February 2086	Wood Snake
12 February 2097	31 January 2098	Fire Snake

In Japan, the new sign of the zodiac starts on 1 January, while in China it starts, according to the traditional Chinese calendar, at the new moon that falls between 21 January and 20 February, so that persons born in January or February may have two different signs in the two countries, but persons born in late February (i.e. on or after 20 February) automatically have one sign in both countries.

== Basic astrological associations ==
Astrology is a cross-cultural phenomenon which remains popular in many cultures or subcultures. These modern trends include a tendency towards syncretism, in which various beliefs of different origin are compounded together. The following table gives examples of this, with such popular ideas as lucky numbers (numerology), lucky colors and lucky times (general aspects of the idea of luck), together with the suggestions toward choosing a suitable partner for an intimate relationship, marriage, or business, for people born during a snake year or generally for the year.

Earthly branch:	Sì
Element:	Fire
Planet:	Venus
Yin Yang:	Yīn
Lunar month:	May 7 to June 6
Lucky numbers:	2, 8, 9
Lucky flowers:	Orchid, cactus
Lucky colors:	Red, yellow, black; Avoid: white, gold, brown
Season:	Spring
Lucky/Associated Countries:	Greece, Georgia, Spain, Estonia, Egypt, Nepal

The snake is the sixth of the twelve signs and belongs to the second trine, with the ox (second sign, 牛, Earthly branch: 丑) and the rooster (tenth sign, 雞/鷄; 鸡; jī, Earthly branch: 酉), with which it is most compatible. The pig is the most incompatible.

== Cultural notes ==
A Snake Year is sometimes referred to as a Little Dragon Year to assuage possible feelings of inadequacy among people born during a Snake Year.

== Gallery ==
Depictions of zodiacal snakes, alone or with the other eleven signs, show how they have been imagined in the calendrical context.

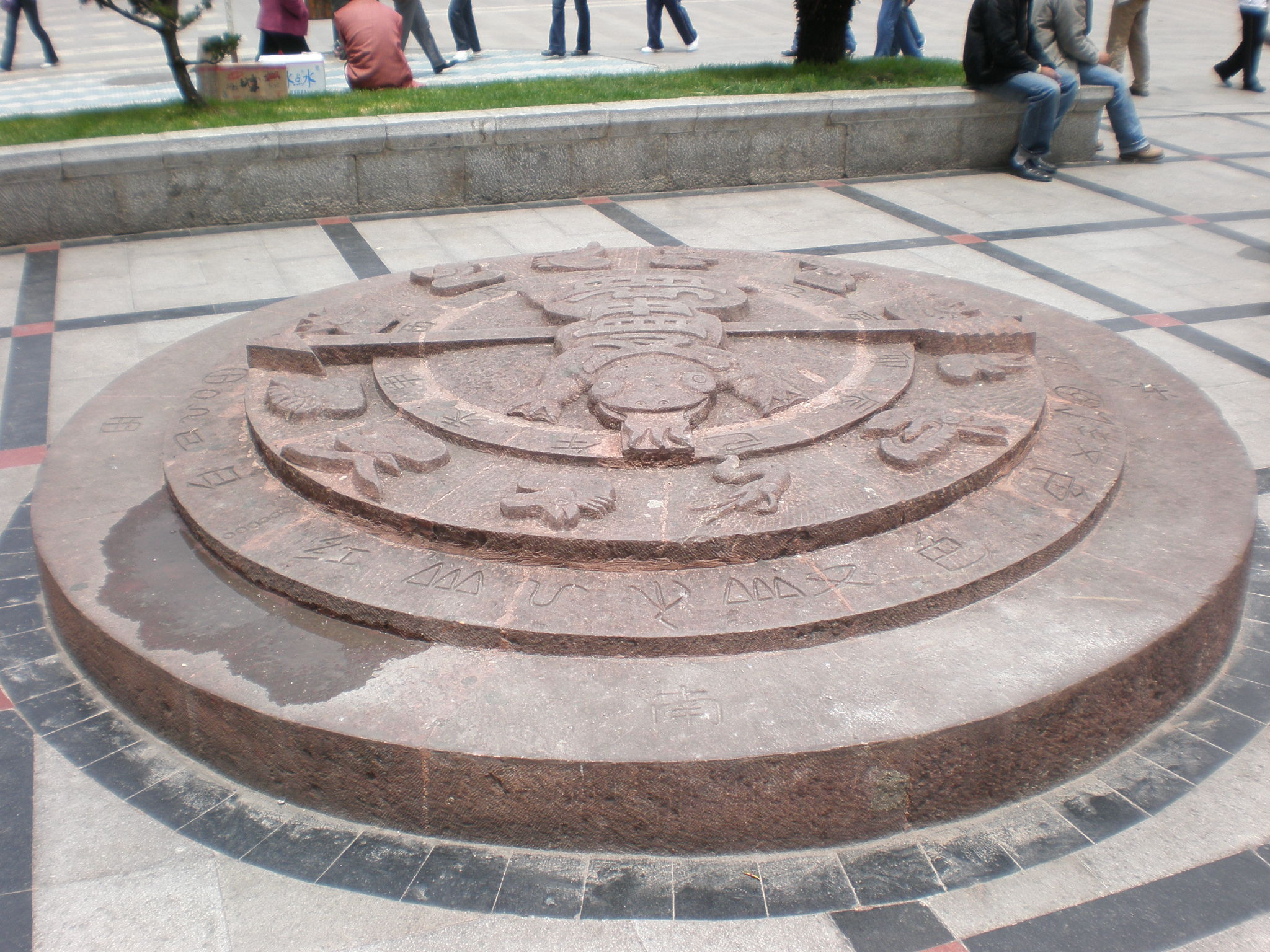
Old Town of Lijiang zodiac circle: a stone circle inscribed with symbols of the Chinese zodiac near the entrance to the Old Town of Lijiang, Yunnan

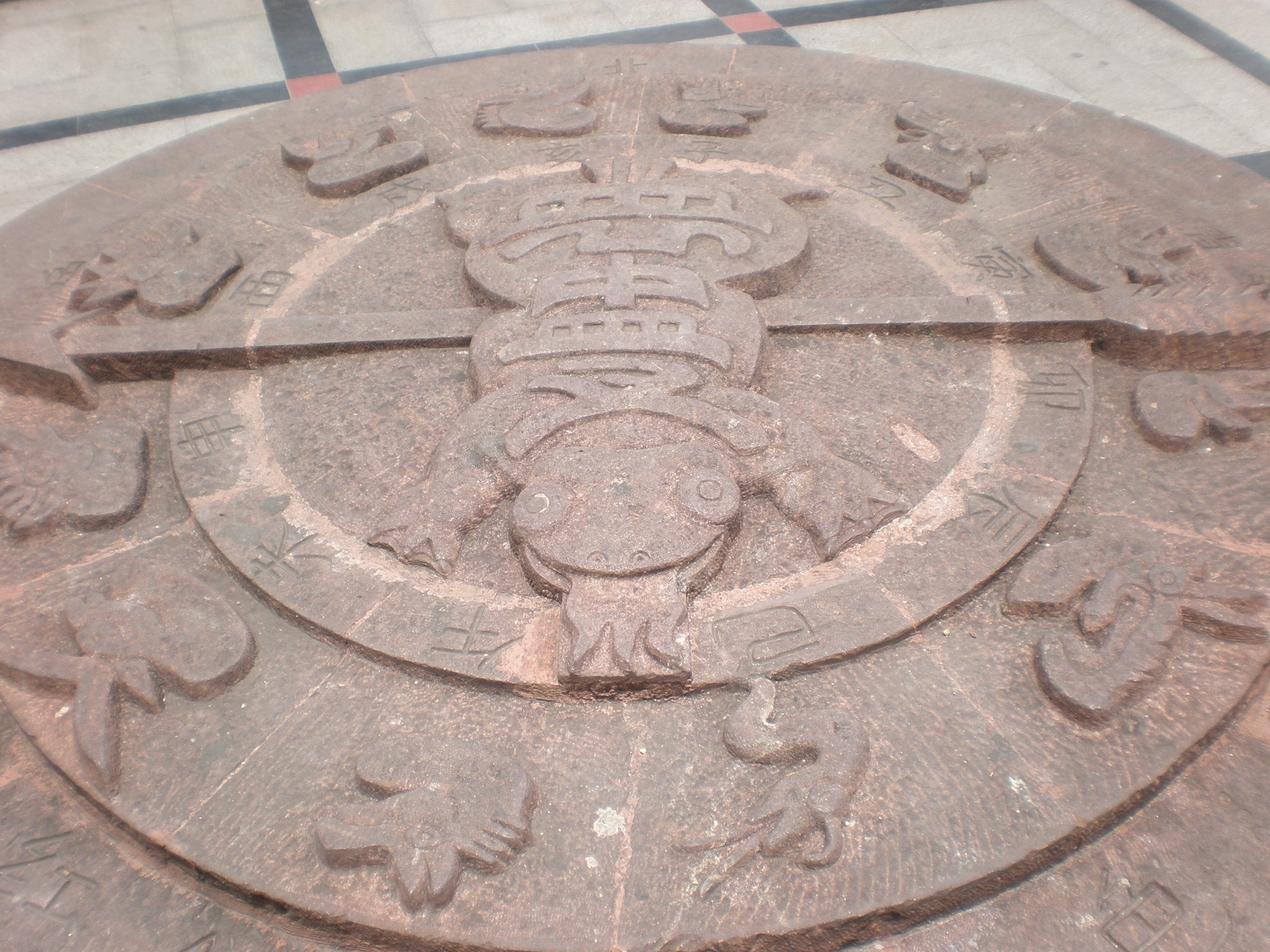
Detail of above, showing the Snake designated by its Earthly Branch sign (front, center right)

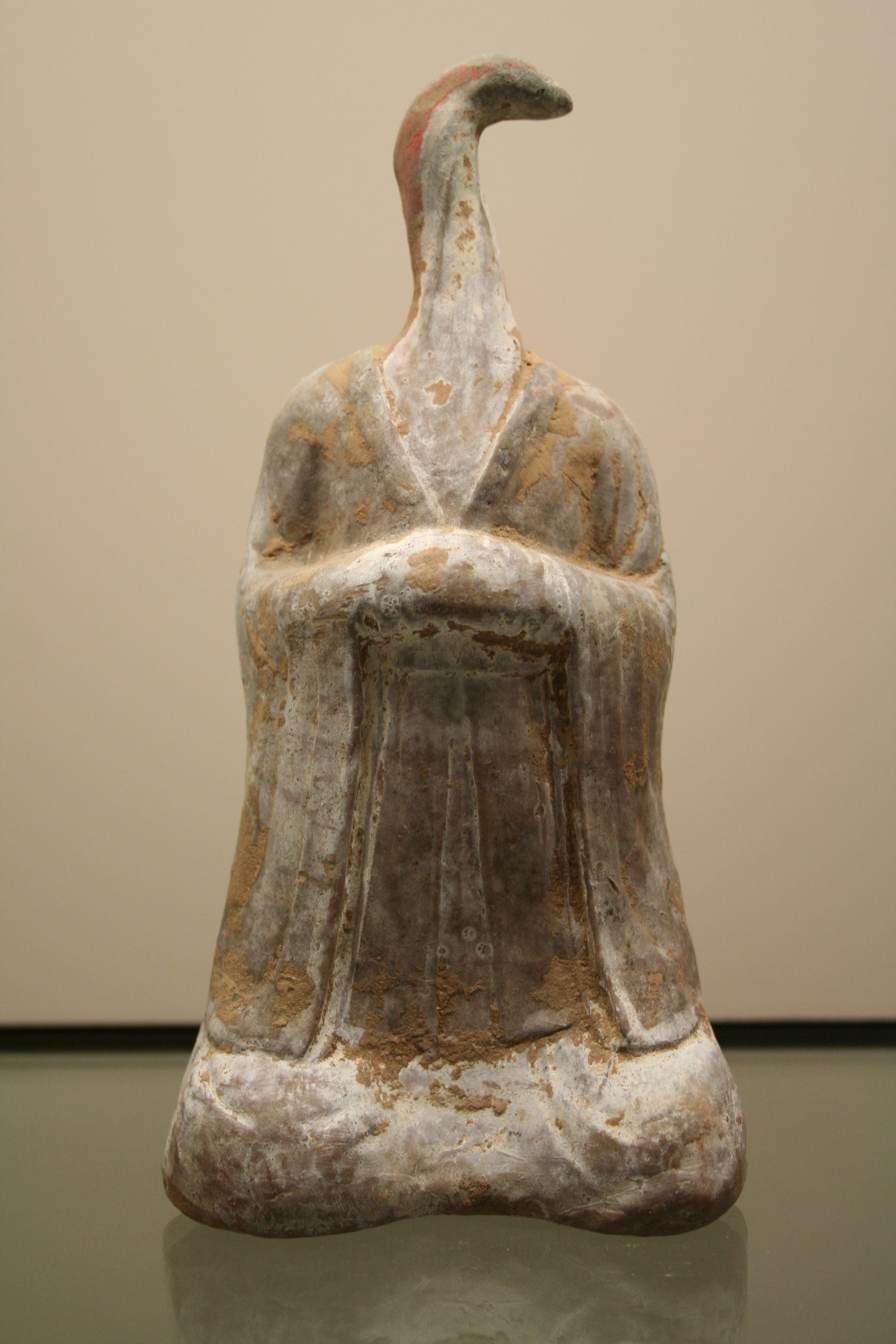
Terracotta zodiacal Snake from the Sui dynasty (581-618).

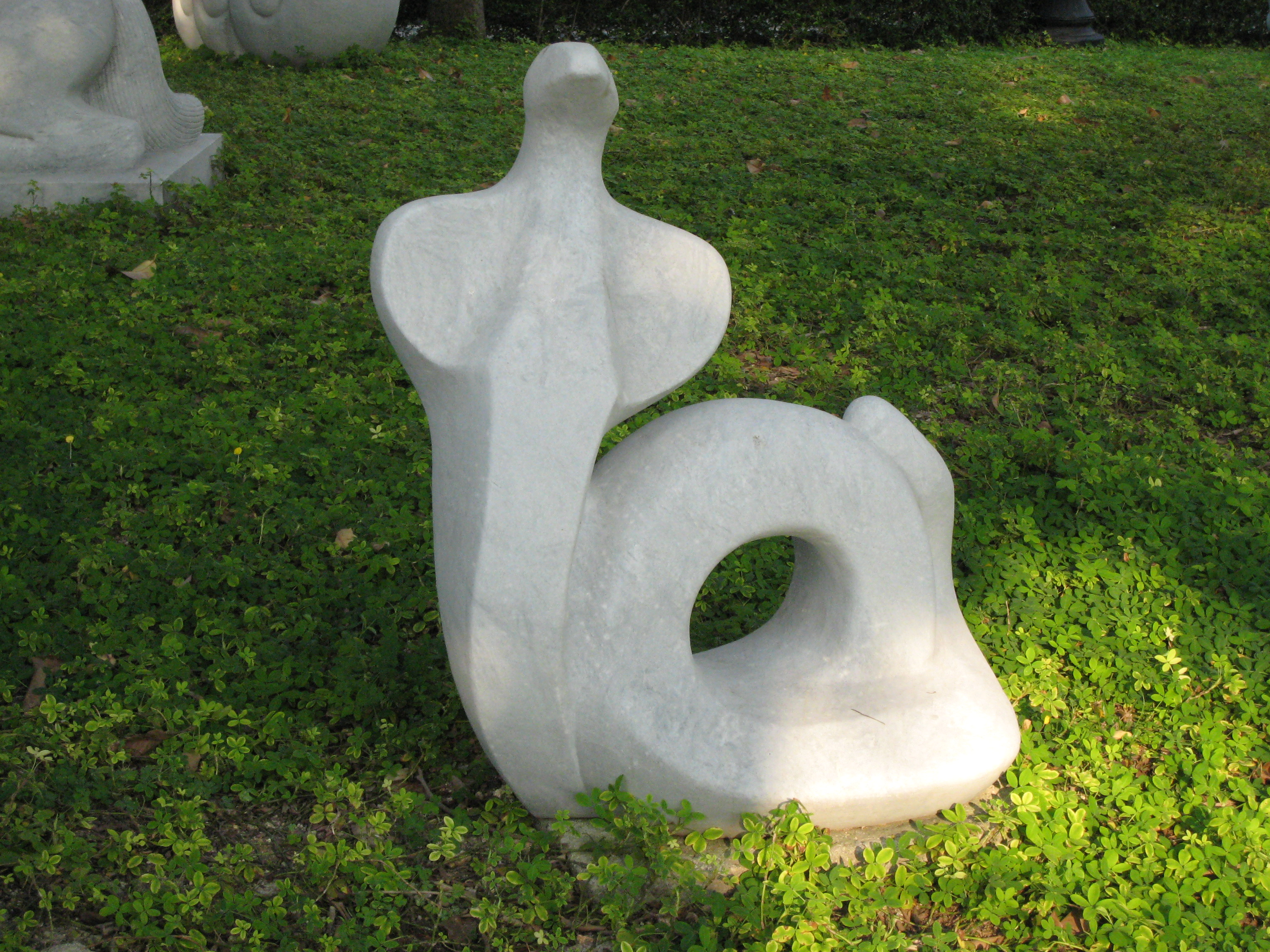
The Snake statue is one of the 12 Chinese zodiac portrayed in the Kowloon Walled City Park in Kowloon City, Hong Kong

== See also ==
- Snakes in Chinese mythology
- Snakes in mythology
- Serpent (symbolism)
