= AD 121 =

121 in various calendars
- Gregorian calendar: 121; CXXI
- Ab urbe condita: 874
- Assyrian calendar: 4871
- Balinese saka calendar: 42–43
- Bengali calendar: −473 – −472
- Berber calendar: 1071
- Buddhist calendar: 665
- Burmese calendar: −517
- Byzantine calendar: 5629–5630
- Chinese calendar: 庚申年 (Metal Monkey); 2818 or 2611 — to — 辛酉年 (Metal Rooster); 2819 or 2612
- Coptic calendar: −163 – −162
- Discordian calendar: 1287
- Ethiopian calendar: 113–114
- Hebrew calendar: 3881–3882
- Hindu calendars
- Vikram Samvat: 177–178
- Shaka Samvat: 42–43
- Kali Yuga: 3221–3222
- Holocene calendar: 10121
- Iranian calendar: 501 BP – 500 BP
- Islamic calendar: 516 BH – 515 BH
- Javanese calendar: N/A
- Julian calendar: 121; CXXI
- Korean calendar: 2454
- Minguo calendar: 1791 before ROC 民前1791年
- Nanakshahi calendar: −1347
- Seleucid era: 432/433 AG
- Thai solar calendar: 663–664
- Tibetan calendar: ལྕགས་ཕོ་སྤྲེ་ལོ་ (male Iron-Monkey); 247 or −134 or −906 — to — ལྕགས་མོ་བྱ་ལོ་ (female Iron-Bird); 248 or −133 or −905

Year 121 (CXXI) was a common year starting on Tuesday of the Julian calendar. At the time, it was known as the Year of the Consulship of Verus and Augur (or, less frequently, year 874 Ab urbe condita). The denomination 121 for this year has been used since the early medieval period, when the Anno Domini calendar era became the prevalent method in Europe for naming years.

== Events ==
=== By place ===
==== Roman Empire ====
- Roman settlement in present-day Wiesbaden, Germany, is first mentioned.
- Emperor Hadrian fixes the border between Roman Britain and Caledonia, on a line running from the River Tyne to the Solway Firth.
- Construction of the Temple of Venus and Roma begins in Rome.

==== Asia ====
- Era name changes from Yongning (2nd year) to Jianguang in the Chinese Eastern Han dynasty.^{(Needs clarification or deletion)}

== Births ==
- April 26 – Marcus Annius Verus, later Emperor Marcus Aurelius (d. 180)

== Deaths ==
- Cai Lun, Chinese inventor of paper and the papermaking process (b. AD 50)
- Deng Sui, Chinese empress of the Han dynasty (b. AD 81)
- Eleutherius and Antia, Roman Christian martyrs and saints
