= 234 =

234 in various calendars
- Gregorian calendar: 234; CCXXXIV
- Ab urbe condita: 987
- Assyrian calendar: 4984
- Balinese saka calendar: 155–156
- Bengali calendar: −360 – −359
- Berber calendar: 1184
- Buddhist calendar: 778
- Burmese calendar: −404
- Byzantine calendar: 5742–5743
- Chinese calendar: 癸丑年 (Water Ox); 2931 or 2724 — to — 甲寅年 (Wood Tiger); 2932 or 2725
- Coptic calendar: −50 – −49
- Discordian calendar: 1400
- Ethiopian calendar: 226–227
- Hebrew calendar: 3994–3995
- Hindu calendars
- Vikram Samvat: 290–291
- Shaka Samvat: 155–156
- Kali Yuga: 3334–3335
- Holocene calendar: 10234
- Iranian calendar: 388 BP – 387 BP
- Islamic calendar: 400 BH – 399 BH
- Javanese calendar: 112–113
- Julian calendar: 234; CCXXXIV
- Korean calendar: 2567
- Minguo calendar: 1678 before ROC 民前1678年
- Nanakshahi calendar: −1234
- Seleucid era: 545/546 AG
- Thai solar calendar: 776–777
- Tibetan calendar: ཆུ་མོ་གླང་ལོ་ (female Water-Ox); 360 or −21 or −793 — to — ཤིང་ཕོ་སྟག་ལོ་ (male Wood-Tiger); 361 or −20 or −792

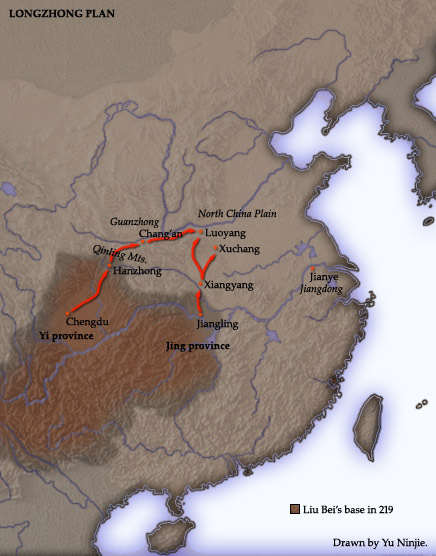
The Longzhong Plan (Three Kingdoms)

Year 234 (CCXXXIV) was a common year starting on Wednesday of the Julian calendar. At the time, it was known as the Year of the Consulship of Pupienus and Sulla (or, less frequently, year 987 Ab urbe condita). The denomination 234 for this year has been used since the early medieval period, when the Anno Domini calendar era became the prevalent method in Europe for naming years.

== Events ==
=== By place ===
==== Roman Empire ====
- Emperor Alexander Severus and his mother Julia Mamaea move to Moguntiacum (modern Mainz), the capital of Germania Superior. His generals have planned a military offensive and built a bridge across the Rhine. Alexander prefers to negotiate for peace by buying off the Alemanni. This policy outrages the Roman legions and he loses the trust of the troops.

==== China ====
- Battle of Wuzhang Plains between the Chinese states of Shu Han and Cao Wei: The army of Shu Han retreats, following an inconclusive result.

==== Korea ====
- Saban becomes king of the Korean kingdom of Baekje. He is succeeded by Goi of Baekje later in the same year.

== Births ==
- Porphyry, Phoenician Neoplatonic philosopher (d. c. 305)
- Wang Rong, Chinese general and politician (d. 305)

== Deaths ==
- April 21 – Xian of Han, Chinese emperor of the Han Dynasty (b. 181)
- Li Miao (or Hannan), Chinese official and politician
- Li Yan (or Li Ping), Chinese general and politician
- Liu Yan (or Weishuo), Chinese general and politician
- Liu Ye (or Ziyang), Chinese court adviser and politician
- Pan Zhang (or Wengui), Chinese general and politician
- Sun Huan (or Jiming), Chinese nobleman and general
- Wei Yan (or Wenchang), Chinese general and politician
- Xiahou Hui (or Yuanrong), Chinese noblewoman (b. 211)
- Zhuge Liang, Chinese statesman and strategist (b. 181)
