= Heavenly Stems =

System of ten ordinals native to China

Chinese name
- Chinese: 天干
Transcriptions
Standard Mandarin
- Hanyu Pinyin: tiāngān
Yue: Cantonese
- Yale Romanization: tīn gōn
- Jyutping: tin1 gon1
Southern Min
- Hokkien POJ: thian-kan

Vietnamese name
- Vietnamese alphabet: thiên can
- Chữ Hán: 天干

Korean name
- Hangul: 천간
- Hanja: 天干
Transcriptions
- Revised Romanization: cheongan

Japanese name
- Kanji: 十干
- Hiragana: じっかん
Transcriptions
- Romanization: jikkan

Manchu name
- Manchu script: ᠠᠪᡴᠠᡳ ᠴᡳᡴᡨᡝᠨ
- Möllendorff: abkai cikten

The ten Heavenly Stems (or Celestial Stems) are a system of ordinals indigenous to China and used throughout East Asia, first attested c. 1250 BCE during the Shang dynasty as the names of the ten days of the week. They were also used in Shang-era rituals in the names of dead family members, who were offered sacrifices on the corresponding day of the Shang week. Stems are no longer used as names for the days of the week, but have acquired many other uses. Most prominently, they have been used in conjunction with the associated set of twelve Earthly Branches in the compound sexagenary cycle, an important feature of historical Chinese calendars.

== Origin ==
甲 (1), 'turtle-shell'

乙 (2), 'fish guts'

丙 (3), 'fish tail'

丁 (4), 'nail'

戊 (5), 'halberd'

己 (6), 'thread'

庚 (7), 'flail and threshing device'

辛 (8), 'branding tool'

壬 (9), 'double-blade axe'

癸 (10), 'four-handled plow'

The Heavenly Stems in their bronze script form.

Some scholars believe the Heavenly Stems, and the associated ten-day week, are connected to a story from Chinese mythology where ten suns appeared in the sky, whose order comprised a ten-day cycle (旬; xún); the Heavenly Stems are conjectured to be the names for each of these ten suns. They were found in the given names of the kings of the Shang in their temple names. These consisted of a relational term ('father', 'mother', 'grandfather', 'grandmother') which was added to one of the ten Stems—e.g. 'Grandfather Jia'. These names are often found on Shang bronzes designating whom the bronze was honoring (and on which day of the week their rites would have been performed, that day matching the day designated by their name). The sinologist David Keightley, who specialized in ancient Chinese bronzes, believes that the Stems were chosen posthumously through divination. Some historians think the ruling class of the Shang had ten clans, but it is not clear whether their society reflected the myth or vice versa. Their association with the concepts of yin and yang and wuxing developed following the collapse of the Shang.

Jonathan Smith has proposed that the heavenly stems predate the Shang and originally referred to ten asterisms along the ecliptic, of which their oracle bone script characters were drawings; he identifies similarities between these and asterisms in the later Four Images and Twenty-Eight Mansions systems. These would have been used to track the moon's progression along its monthly circuit, in conjunction with the earthly branches referring to its phase.

The literal meanings of the characters were, and are now, roughly as follows. Among the modern meanings, those deriving from the characters' position in the sequence of Heavenly Stems are in italics.

Heavenly Stem		Pinyin	Meaning	
Heavenly Stem		Pinyin	Original	Additional
1	Chinese: 甲	jiǎ	'turtle shell'	'first' (ordinal); 'methyl group'; 'helmet'; 'armor'; words related to beetles, crustaceans, fingernails, toenails
2	Chinese: 乙	yǐ	'fish guts'	'second' (ordinal); 'ethyl group'; 'twist'
3	Chinese: 丙	bǐng	'fish tail'	'third' (ordinal); 'bright'; 'fire'
4	Chinese: 丁	dīng	'nail' (fastener)	'fourth' (ordinal); 'male adult'; 'robust'; 'T-shaped'; 'to strike'; a surname
5	Chinese: 戊	wù	'halberd'	—N/a
6	Chinese: 己	jǐ	'thread on a loom'	'self'
7	Chinese: 庚	gēng	'evening star' (Venus)	'age' (of a person)
8	Chinese: 辛	xīn	'to offend superiors'	'bitter'; 'piquant'; 'toilsome'
9	Chinese: 壬	rén	'burden'	'to shoulder'; 'to trust with office'
10	Chinese: 癸	guǐ	'four-handled plow'	—N/a

== Current usage ==
The Heavenly Stems remain widely used as ordinals throughout the Sinosphere, similarly to the way the alphabet is used in languages like English.

- The Chinese mathematician Li Shanlan (1810–1882) developed a system using the Heavenly Stems and Earthly Branches to stand in for Latin letters in their use as labels for mathematical variables. In Li's system, the letters a – j are represented by the ten Heavenly Stems, k – v are represented by the twelve Earthly Branches, and the final four letters w, x, y and z are represented by 物 ('matter'), 天 ('Heaven'), 地 ('earth'), and 人 ('human') respectively. The ⼝ 'MOUTH' radical may be added to any of the aforementioned character to indicate the upper case form of the corresponding letter: e.g. a → 甲, A → 呷; d → 丁, D → 叮.
- Names for organic chemicals—e.g. methanol (甲醇; jiǎchún), ethanol (乙醇; yǐchún).
- Diseases—e.g. Hepatitis A (甲型肝炎; jiǎxíng gānyán), Hepatitis B: (乙型肝炎; yǐxíng gānyán).
- Sports leagues—e.g. Serie A is rendered as 意甲; Yìjiǎ.
- Students' grades in Taiwan, with the yōu (優; 'excellence') inserted prior to the Heavenly Stems in the list—i.e. the American grades A, B, C, D and F correspond to 優, 甲, 乙, 丙 and 丁.
- In astrology and feng shui, the Heavenly Stems and Earthly Branches form the four pillars of Chinese metaphysics in Qimen Dunjia and Daliuren.
- In Korea and Japan, the Heavenly Stems are used in legal documents: the Korean renderings gap (甲) and eul (乙) are used to indicate the larger and the smaller parties to a legal contract, respectively—and are sometimes used as synonyms for such. This use is also common in the Korean IT industry.

== See also ==
- Chinese numerals
- Organic nomenclature in Chinese

== Notes ==
=== Bibliography ===
- Allan, Sarah (1991). The Shape of the Turtle: Myth, Art, and Cosmos in Early China. Albany: State University of New York Press. ISBN 978-0-7914-0459-1.
- Barnard, Noel (1986). "A New Approach to the Study of Clan-Sign Inscriptions of Shang". In Kwang-chih Chang (ed.). Studies of Shang Archaeology: Selected Papers from the International Conference on Shang Civilization. New Haven, CT: Yale University Press. pp. 141–206. ISBN 978-0-300-03578-0.
- Tsien, Tsuen-hsuin; Chang, Kwang-chih (1978). "T'ien kan: a key to the history of the Shang". In Roy, David (ed.). Ancient China: Studies in Early Civilization. Hong Kong: Chinese University Press. pp. 13–42. ISBN 978-962-201-144-1.
- Chang Tai-Ping (1978). "The role of the t'ien-kan ti-chih terms in the naming system of the Yin". Early China. 4: 45–48. doi:10.1017/S0362502800005897. S2CID 161397647.
- Keightley, David (2000). The Ancestral Landscape: Time, Space, and Community in Late Shang China, ca. 1200-1045 B.C. Berkeley: Center for Chinese Studies, University of California. ISBN 978-1-55729-070-0.
- Norman, Jerry (1985). "A Note on the Origins of the Chinese Duodenary Cycle". In Thurgood, Graham (ed.). Linguistics of the Sino-Tibetan Area: The State of the Art: Papers Presented to Paul K. Benedict for his 71st Birthday. Canberra: Australian National University. pp. 85–89. ISBN 0-85883-319-0.
- Pulleyblank, Edwin G. (1995). "The Ganzhi as Phonograms". Early China News. 8: 29–30. ISSN 0362-5028. JSTOR 23351501.
- Smith, Adam (2011). "The Chinese sexagenary cycle and the ritual origins of the calendar". In Steele, John (ed.). Calendars and Years II: Astronomy and Time in the Ancient and Medieval World (PDF). Oxford: Oxbow. pp. 1–37. ISBN 978-1-84217-987-1. Archived from the original (PDF) on 2011-08-13.
