= Cat (zodiac) =

Sign of the Vietnamese zodiac

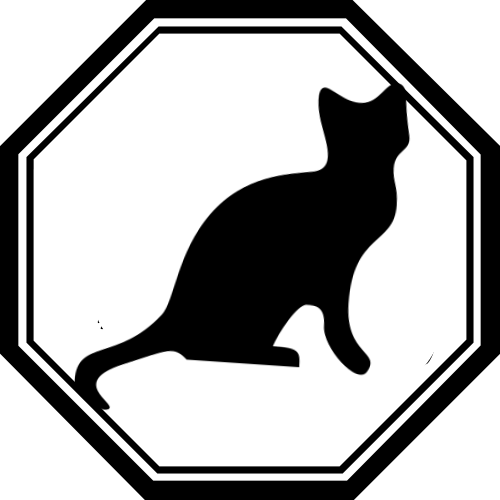
Vietnamese Cat zodiac

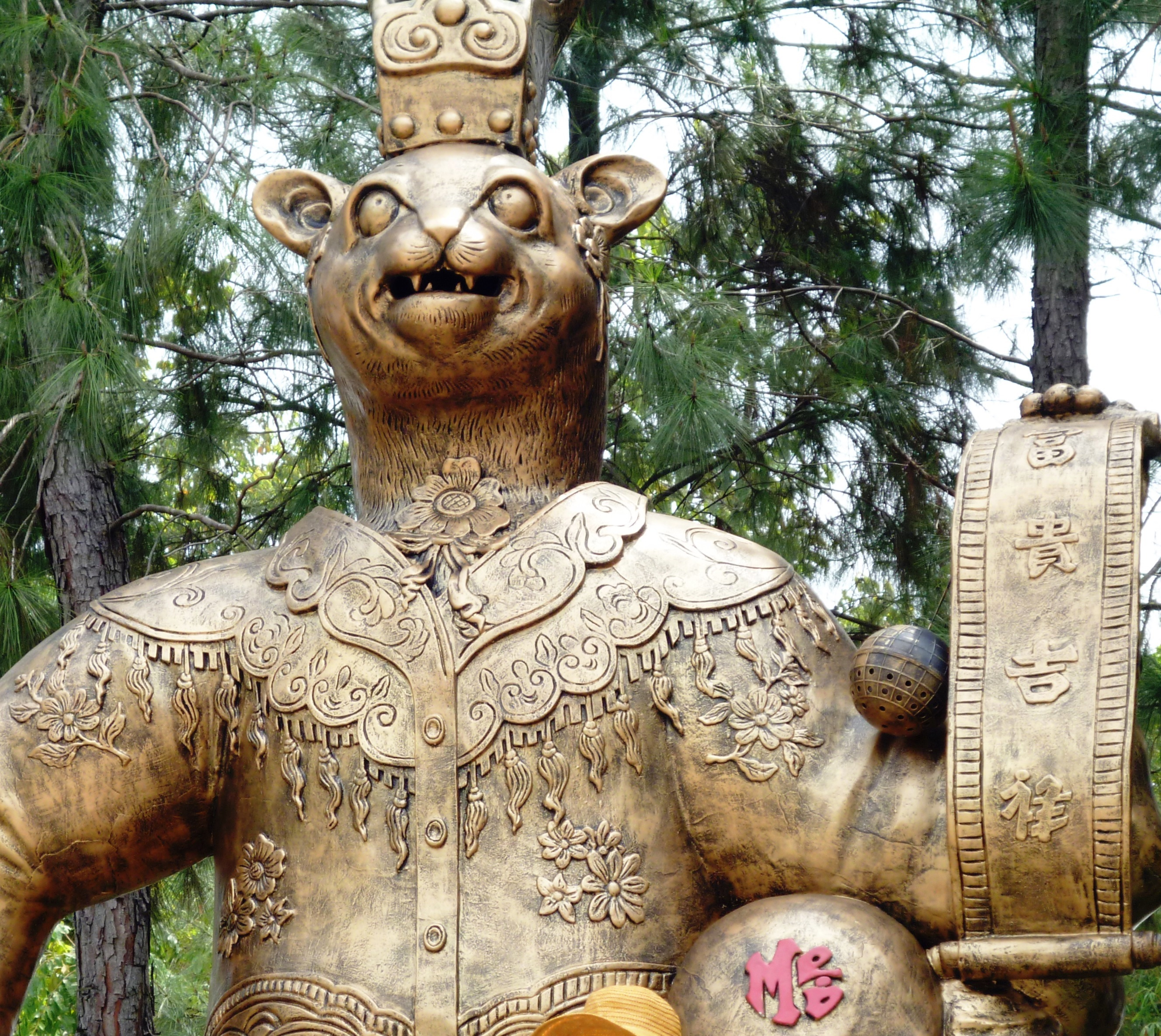
Cat zodiac statue in Suối Tiên park

The Cat is the 4th animal symbol in the 12-year cycle of the Vietnamese zodiac, and Gurung zodiac, taking place of the Rabbit in the Chinese zodiac. As such, the traits associated with the Rabbit are attributed to the Cat. Cats are in conflict with the Rat.

Legends relating to the order of the Chinese zodiac often include stories as to why the cat was not included among the twelve. Because the Rat tricked the cat into missing the banquet with the Jade Emperor, the cat was not included and was not aware that the banquet was going on and was not given a year, thus began the antipathy between cats and rats. It is possible domesticated cats had not proliferated through China at the zodiac's induction.

Another legend known as "The Great Race" tells that all the animals in the zodiac were headed to the Jade Emperor. The Cat and Rat were the most intelligent of the animals, however they were both also poor swimmers and came across a river. They both tricked the kind, naïve Ox to assist them by letting them ride on its back over the river. As the Ox was approaching the other side of the river, the Rat pushed the Cat into the river, then jumped off the Ox and rushed to the Jade Emperor, becoming the first in the zodiac. All the other animals made it to the Jade Emperor, while the Cat was left to drown in the river after being sabotaged by the Rat. It is said that this is also the reason cats always hunt rats.

There have been various explanations of why the Vietnamese, unlike all other countries who follow the Chinese calendar, have the cat instead of the Rabbit as a zodiac animal. The most common explanation is that in the ordering system (Earthly Branches) that is used for lunar year, the word used for the "rabbit zodiac" 卯 (Mão ~ Mẹo) sounds like the Vietnamese word for "cat" (con mèo).

== Other explanations ==
Other explanations for the use of the cat zodiac in Vietnam come from oral histories that can be difficult to trace to an original source. Vietnam hasn’t always celebrated the Year of the Cat, however it is unclear when the switch from rabbit to cat took place. Mentions of the Year of the Rabbit can be found in many older Vietnamese texts. Different families and cultural groups in Vietnam have unique explanations for the shift, both historical and in folklore.

One geographical explanation suggests that Chinese nomads living in the savanna had frequent encounters with rabbits in the wild fields. In contrast, the lowland people of Vietnam had less interaction with rabbits and instead chose the domestic cat. Rabbits were viewed as animals used for food, while cats were considered a ‘friendly’ animal. Rabbits are also not commonly raised in Vietnam.

Another explanation states that in Vietnamese folklore, the cat (which was tricked out of the race by the rat in Chinese legend) actually finishes the race. The Vietnamese legend lacks a rabbit and the cat is able to swim, allowing it to take fourth place.

Cats hold unique spiritual and practical meaning in Vietnam. They are considered lucky, and help to ward off bad spirits. In the 2011 Year of the Cat, there was a baby boom recorded due to the association of luck with those born under this zodiac. Cats are frequently featured in Vietnamese folklore and rhymes, and are often depicted assisting farmers in chasing away rats. Rice farming is very important to Vietnamese agriculture, and the threat of field rats means cats are a popular animal for farmers.

The shift to the cat also reflects a difference in cultural values. While the Year of the Rabbit is considered to be mild and peaceful, the cat symbolizes strength, power, and aggression. Another cultural explanation suggests the Vietnamese closely linked the mouse (rat) and rabbit, and didn’t want to observe two similar years.

In addition to the cat, the Vietnamese also celebrate the Year of the Buffalo as opposed to the Year of the Ox in the Chinese zodiac.

== Years and the Five Elements ==
People born within the date ranges below can be said to have been born under the "Year of the Cat", instead of "Year of the Rabbit".

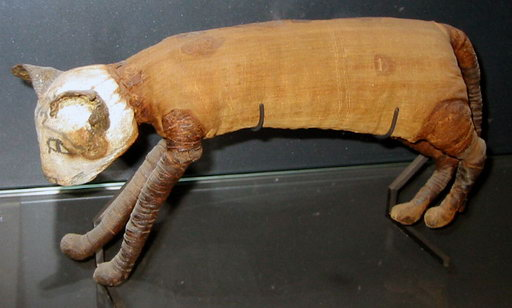
A mummified cat

Start date	End date	Heavenly branch
29 January 1903	15 February 1904	Water Cat
14 February 1915	3 February 1916	Wood Cat
2 February 1927	22 January 1928	Fire Cat
19 February 1939	7 February 1940	Earth Cat
6 February 1951	26 January 1952	Metal Cat
25 January 1963	12 February 1964	Water Cat
11 February 1975	30 January 1976	Wood Cat
29 January 1987	16 February 1988	Fire Cat
16 February 1999	4 February 2000	Earth Cat
3 February 2011	22 January 2012	Metal Cat
22 January 2023	9 February 2024	Water Cat
8 February 2035	27 January 2036	Wood Cat
26 January 2047	13 February 2048	Fire Cat
11 February 2059	1 February 2060	Earth Cat
31 January 2071	18 February 2072	Metal Cat
17 February 2083	5 February 2084	Water Cat
5 February 2095	24 January 2096	Wood Cat

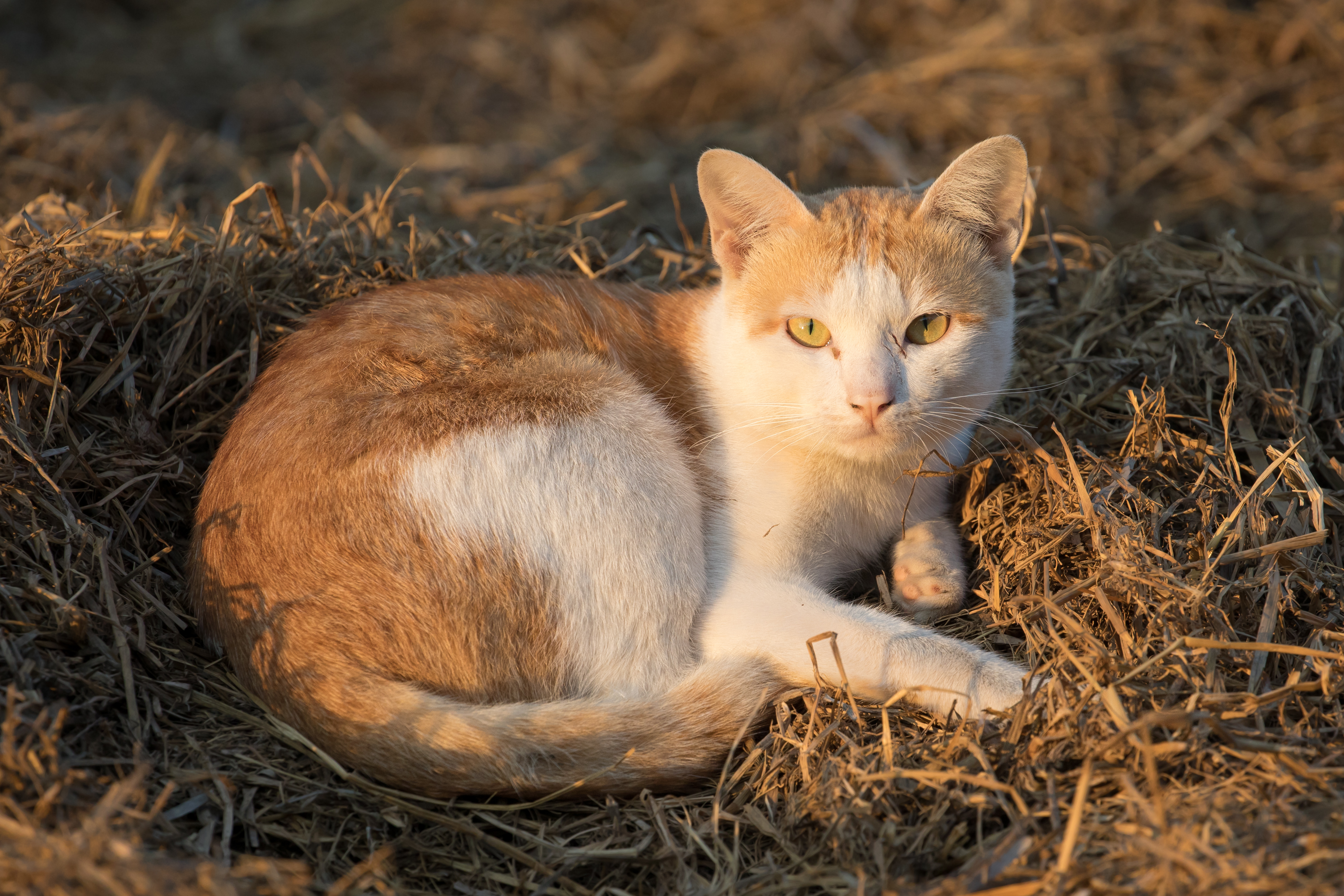
A cat lying on rice straw

== Vietnamese zodiac Cat ==
Sign	Best Match	Average	No Match
Cat	Pig, Goat, Cat, Dog,	Tiger, Horse, Dragon, Monkey, Snake, Ox	Rooster & Rat

== Basic astrology elements ==
Earthly Branches of Birth Year:	Tree
The Five Elements:	Wood
Yin Yang:	Yin
Lunar Month:	Second
Lucky Numbers:	3, 6, 9; Avoid: 1, 7, 8
Lucky Flowers:	flower of fragrant plantain lily, nerve plant, snapdragon
Lucky Colors:	black, pink, purple, blue, red; Avoid: brown, yellow, white
Season:	Spring

== See also ==
- Cat
- Year of the Cat, a 1976 song by Scottish singer-songwriter Al Stewart
