= Zou Yan =

Zhou Dynasty philosopher

- Traditional Chinese: 鄒衍
- Simplified Chinese: 邹衍
Transcriptions
Standard Mandarin
- Hanyu Pinyin: Zōu Yǎn
- Wade–Giles: Tsou^{1} Yen^{3}
- IPA: [tsóʊ jɛ̀n]
Yue: Cantonese
- Yale Romanization: Jāu Yín
- Jyutping: Zau^{1} Jin^{2}
Southern Min
- Tâi-lô: Tsau Ián
Old Chinese
- Baxter–Sagart (2014): *[ts]ˤro N-q(r)anʔ

Zou Yan (Chinese: 鄒衍; 305 BC – 240 BC) was a Chinese philosopher and spiritual writer of the Warring States-era. He was best known as the representative thinker of the Yin and Yang School (or School of Naturalists) during the Hundred Schools of Thought era in Chinese philosophy.

== Biography ==
Zou Yan was a noted scholar of the Jixia Academy in the state of Qi. The British biochemist and sinologist, Joseph Needham, describes Zou as "The real founder of all Chinese scientific thought." His teachings combined and systematized two current theories during the Warring States period: Yin-Yang and the Five Elements/Phases (metal, wood, water, fire, and earth). All of Zou Yan's writings have been lost and are only known through quotations in early Chinese texts. The best information comes from his brief biography in the Records of the Grand Historian (1st century BC) by Sima Qian. It describes him as a polymath (philosopher, historian, politician, naturalist, geographer, astrologer) who came from the coastal state of Qi (present day Shandong), where he was a member of the state-sponsored Jixia Academy. Needham writes:

He saw that the rulers were becoming ever more dissolute and incapable of valuing virtue. ... So he examined deeply into the phenomena of the increase and decrease of the Yin and the Yang, and wrote essays totaling more than 100,000 words about their strange permutations, and about the cycles of the great sages from beginning to end. His sayings were vast and far-reaching, and not in accord with the accepted beliefs of the classics. First he had to examine small objects, and from these he drew conclusions about large ones, until he reached what was without limit. First he spoke about modern times, and from this he went back to the time of (Huang Di). The scholars all studied his arts. ... He began by classifying China's notable mountains, great rivers and connecting valleys; its birds and beasts; the fruitfulness of its water and soils, and its rare products; and from this extended his survey to what is beyond the seas, and men are unable to observe. Then starting from the time of the separation of the Heavens and the Earth, and coming down, he made citations of the revolutions and transmutations of the Five Powers (Virtues), arranging them until each found its proper place and was confirmed (by history). (Zou Yan) maintained that what the Confucians called the "Middle Kingdom" (i.e. China) holds a place in the whole world of but one part in eighty-one. ... Princes, dukes and great officials, when they first witnessed his arts, fearfully transformed themselves, but later were unable to practice them.

A depiction of Yan on the Chocolate Frog Card (made by the Harry Potter production team)

Zou Yan is commonly associated with Daoism and the origins of Chinese alchemy, going back to the (ca. 100 AD) Book of Han that calls him a fangshi (方士 [literally "technique master"] "alchemist; magician; exorcist; diviner"). Holmes Welch proposes the fangshi were among those whom Sima Qian described as "unable to practice" Zou Yan's arts, and says while Zou "gradually acquired alchemistical stature, he himself knew nothing of the art. It was probably developed by those of his followers who became interested in physical experimentation with the Five Elements."

== See also ==
- Jiuzhou
