= Vietnamese calendar =

Lunisolar calendar of Vietnam

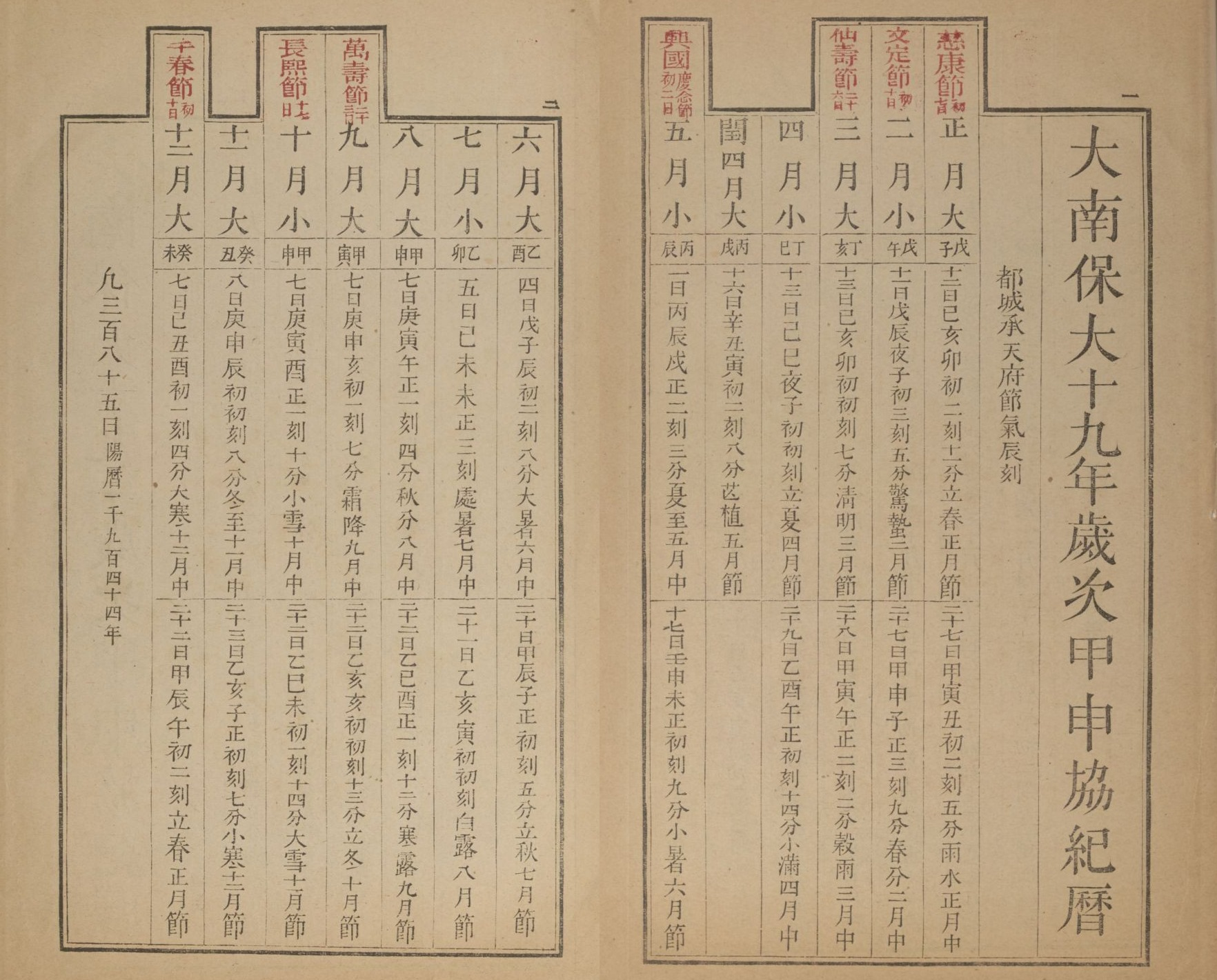
A calendar issued for the year Bảo Đại 19 (1944), entitled "Đại Nam Hiệp Kỷ Calendar of Giáp Thân (Wood Monkey) year Bảo Đại 19" (大南保大十九年歲次甲申協紀曆, Đại Nam Bảo Đại thập cửu niên tuế thứ Giáp Thân hiệp kỷ lịch) showing all the national holidays and observations of the Nguyễn dynasty.

The Vietnamese calendar (Vietnamese: âm lịch; chữ Hán: 陰曆) is a lunisolar calendar that is mostly based on the lunisolar Chinese calendar. As Vietnam's official calendar has been the Gregorian calendar since 1954, the Vietnamese calendar is used mainly to observe lunisolar holidays and commemorations, such as Tết Nguyên Đán and Tết Trung Thu.

== Historical developments ==
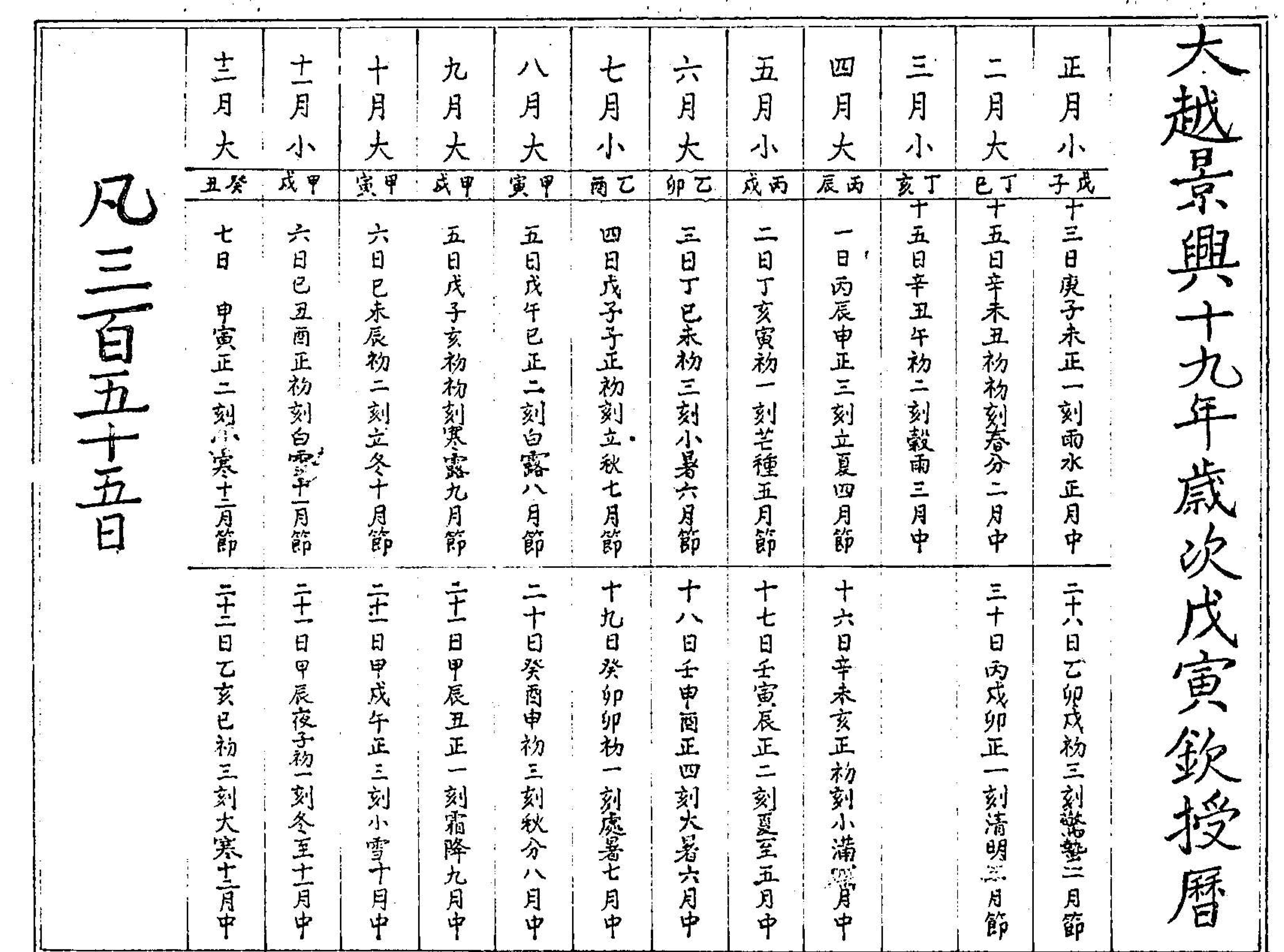
A calendar used during the Lê dynasty, titled Đại Việt Cảnh Hưng thập cửu niên tuế thứ Mậu Dần Khâm Thụ lịch 大越景興十九年歳次戊寅欽授曆 (1758).

After Vietnam regained independence following the third Chinese domination of Vietnam, the following dynasties established their own calendars based on Chinese prototypes, and every subsequent dynasty had appointed officers to man and create the calendar to be used in the realm. According to the Đại Việt sử lược historical chronicles, the Vietnamese rulers started building astronomical/astrological facilities in the capital Thăng Long (chữ Hán: 昇龍; i.e. modern Hanoi) as early as 1029. Beginning in 1324, the Yuan dynasty introduced the Thụ Thời (Chinese: 授時; pinyin: shòu shí) calendar to the Trần dynasty.

Calendar name	Year in use	Dynasties	Offices	Notes
Unknown	1080-1324	Lý dynasty, Trần dynasty	Chính Dương Lâu 正陽樓 (building), Unknown	Calendar was calculated based on the methods of the Song dynasty. But it contains some differences in dates. Hoàng Xuân Hãn notes there were five differences in years with three of them containing leap months (tháng nhuận). A complete calendar has yet to be found.
Thụ Thời 授時	1324–1339	Trần dynasty	Unknown	It was introduced by the Yuan dynasty to the Trần dynasty.
Hiệp Kỷ 協紀	1339–1401	Trần dynasty	Unknown	A name change with no changes to calculation methods.
Thuận Thiên 順天	1401–1413	Hồ dynasty	Unknown	Hiệp Kỷ calendar abolished, with Thuận Thiên replacing it. There was no documentation on the difference between the two.
Khâm Thụ 欽授	1413–1812	Lê dynasty	Tư Thiên Giám 司天鑑	Introduced by the Ming dynasty in 1369, during the Fourth Chinese domination of Vietnam, the Ming administration in Vietnam used the Datong calendar. At the start of the Vietnamese Lê dynasty in 1428, the end of Chinese domination over Vietnam, the calendar was not changed. The calendar was calculated using the same method as the Datong calendar. But there were differences in the calendar, the calendar had three leap months compared to the Chinese calendar which had two. Mostly likely due to longitude differences.
Thời Hiến 時憲	1789-1802	Tây Sơn dynasty	Unknown	The calendar recorded in the book Lịch đại niên kỷ bách trúng kinh 曆代年紀百中經 was shown to be the same calendar used by the Qing dynasty. However, it is not well researched as the Nguyễn dynasty burned many documents from that time.
Vạn Toàn 萬全	1631–1812	Nguyễn lords, early Nguyễn dynasty	Chiêm Hầu Tư 占侯司	This calendar existed alongside the Khâm Thụ 欽授 calendar that was used by the Lê dynasty and the Thời Hiến 時憲 calendar used by the Tây Sơn dynasty which was recorded in the book, Lịch đại niên kỷ bách trúng kinh 曆代年紀百中經.
Hiệp Kỷ 協紀	1813–1840	Nguyễn dynasty	Khâm Thiên Giám 欽天鑑	Hiệp Kỷ is not to be confused with its earlier namesake. The Nguyễn dynasty adopted the methods used by the Qing dynasty in 1812. Nguyễn Hữu Thận was an envoy to China, he brought back the book, Đại Thanh lịch tượng khảo thành thư 大清曆象考成書. The Hiệp Kỷ 協紀 calendar was modelled on the methods (Thời Hiến; 時憲) found in the book.
Gregorian (dương lịch; 陽曆)	early 19th century	Nguyễn dynasty	Khâm Thiên Giám 欽天鑑	The Gregorian calendar was introduced by the French, and was used in Vietnamese administrative offices at the same time as the Hiệp Kỷ calendar, which remained in use by the Vietnamese royal court.
Hiệp Kỷ 協紀	1841–1954	Nguyễn dynasty	Khâm Thiên Giám 欽天鑑	Beginning in 1841, Hiệp Kỷ began to differ from Shíxiàn due to longitudinal differences between Vietnam and China.

Beginning in 1954, Vietnamese administrative offices officially used the Gregorian calendar, while the civilian populace continued to use a variety of local calendars derived from French, Chinese and Japanese sources, including the Hiệp Kỷ calendar. On 8 August 1967, the North Vietnamese government issued a decree to change Vietnamese standard time from UTC+8 to UTC+7, as well as make the Gregorian calendar the sole official calendar, restricting lunisolar calendar use to holidays and commemorations. Southern Vietnam would later join this change at the end of the Vietnam War in 1975.

== Differences from the Chinese calendar ==
The Chinese calendar is based on astronomical observations and is therefore dependent on what is considered the local standard time. North Vietnam switched from UTC+8 to UTC+7 on 8 August 1967, with southern Vietnam doing likewise in 1975 at the end of the Vietnam War. As a result of the shift, North and South Vietnam celebrated Tết 1968 on different days. This effect would see the solstice falling on 21 December in Hanoi, while it was 22 December for Beijing.

As the 11th month of the Chinese calendar must contain the winter solstice, it is not the month from 23 November 1984 to 21 December 1984 as per the Vietnamese calendar, but rather the one from 22 December 1984 to 20 January 1985. The effect of this is that the Vietnamese New Year would fall on 21 January 1985, whereas the Chinese New Year would fall on 20 February 1985, a one-month difference. The two calendars agreed again after a leap month lasting from 21 March to 19 April of that year was inserted into the Vietnamese calendar.

In the Vietnamese zodiac, the cat replaces the Rabbit in the Chinese zodiac. So, a child born in the Chinese year of the Rabbit will be born in the Vietnamese year of the Cat (mẹo/mão). The Vietnamese zodiac uses the same animals as the Chinese zodiac for the remaining 11 years, though the Ox of the Chinese zodiac is usually considered to be a water buffalo (sửu/trâu) in the Vietnamese zodiac.

== Examples ==
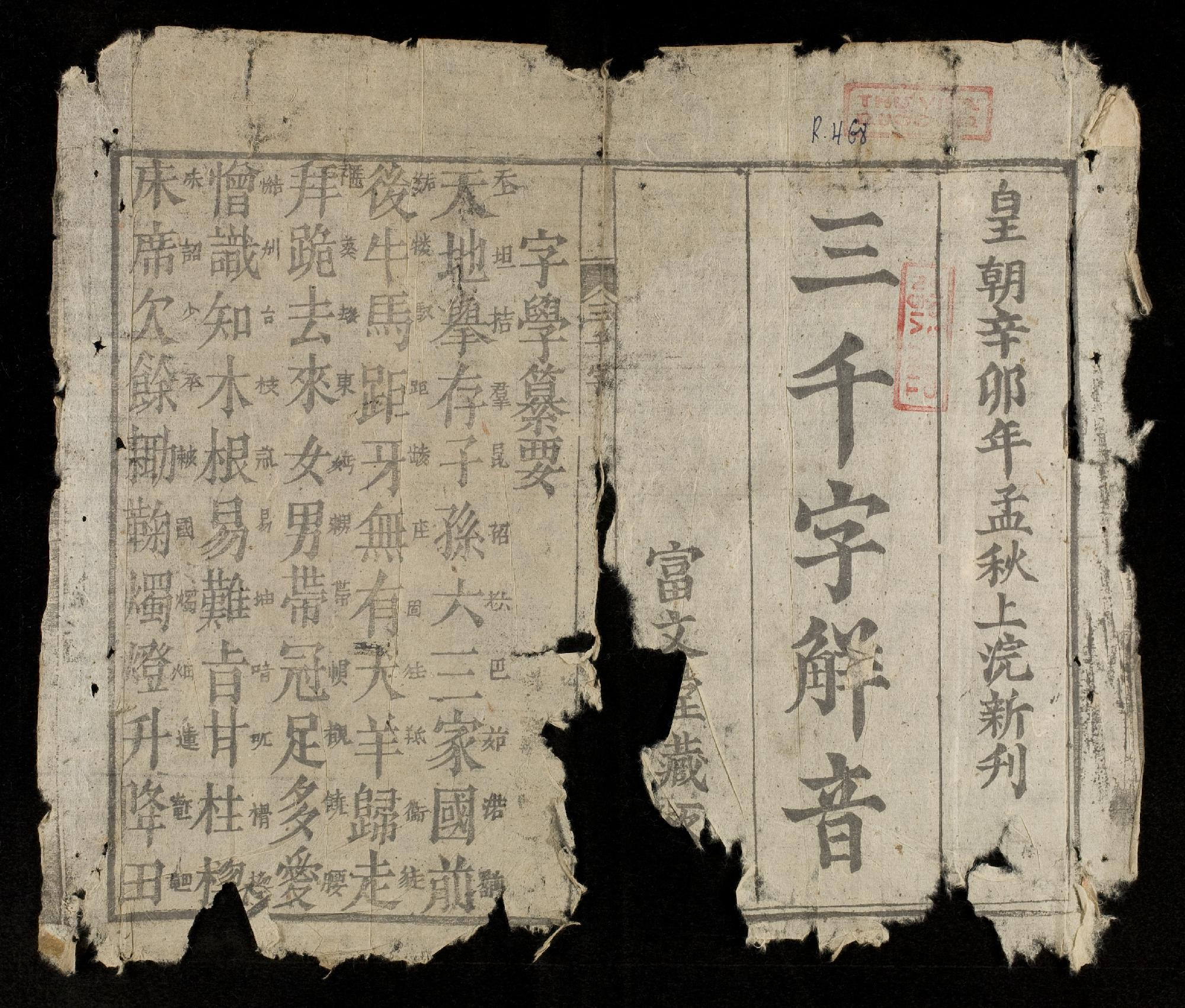
The title page of the book, Tam thiên tự giải âm, with the date published being listed on the right.

The title page lists the publishing date, "皇朝辛卯年孟秋上浣新刊" (Hoàng triều Tân mão niên mạnh thu thượng hoán tân san) on the right of the title (三千字解音).

Text	Meaning
皇朝 Hoàng triều	Imperial court/dynasty
辛卯年 Tân Mão niên	The 28th Can Chi 干支 (Sexagenary cycle) which corresponds to the year 1831 in the Gregorian calendar
孟秋上 Mạnh thu thượng	The first half of the autumn season, can be interpreted as early autumn
浣新刊 Hoán tân san	Newly published edition

- The date can be translated as "In the Tân Mão (辛卯) year of the imperial dynasty, during the early autumn, a newly published edition [is released]." (1831)
- Typically other books will denote the era name of the emperors' reign in the publishing date such as the date in book, 千字文解音 Thiên tự văn giải âm, where the date listed is as "成泰庚寅年孟春上浣新刊" (Thành Thái canh dần niên mạnh xuân thượng hoán tân san). It can be translated as "In the Canh Dần (庚寅) year during the reign of Thành Thái, during the early spring, a newly published edition [is released]." (1890).

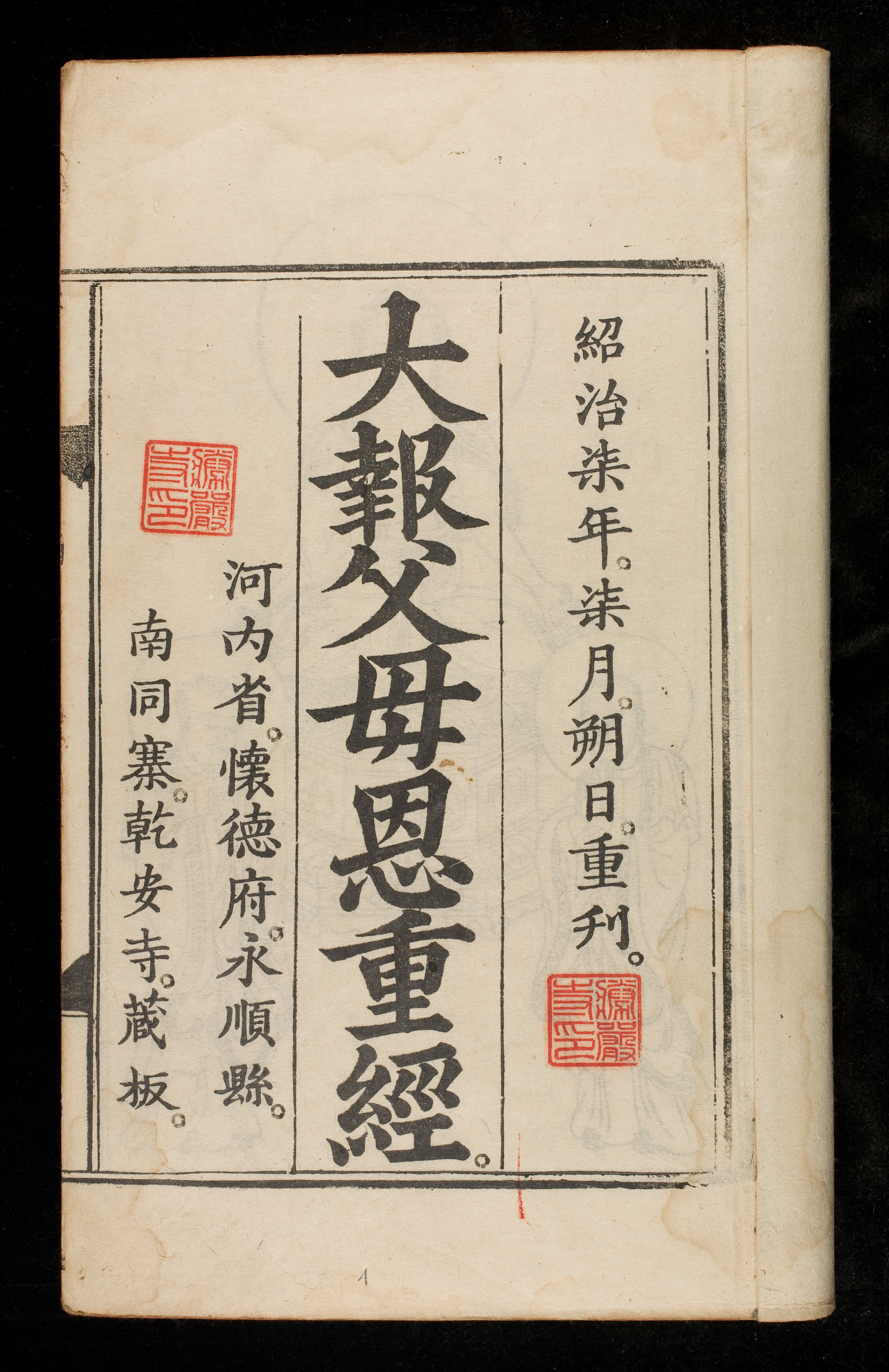
The title page of Đại báo phụ mẫu ân trọng kinh 大報父母恩重經, which has the publishing date on the right.

The title page lists the publishing date, "紹治柒年柒月朔日重刊" (Thiệu Trị thất niên thất nguyệt sóc nhật trùng san) on the right of the title (大報父母恩重經).

Text	Meaning
紹治 Thiệu Trị	Era name of the emperor Thiệu Trị
柒年 Thất niên	Seventh year of his reign
柒月 Thất nguyệt	Seventh month of year
朔日 Sóc nhật	First day of the month
重刊 Trùng san	Republished edition

- The date can be translated as "On the first day of the seventh month in the seventh year of the Thiệu Trị era, a republished edition [is released]." (11 August 1847)

== Gallery ==
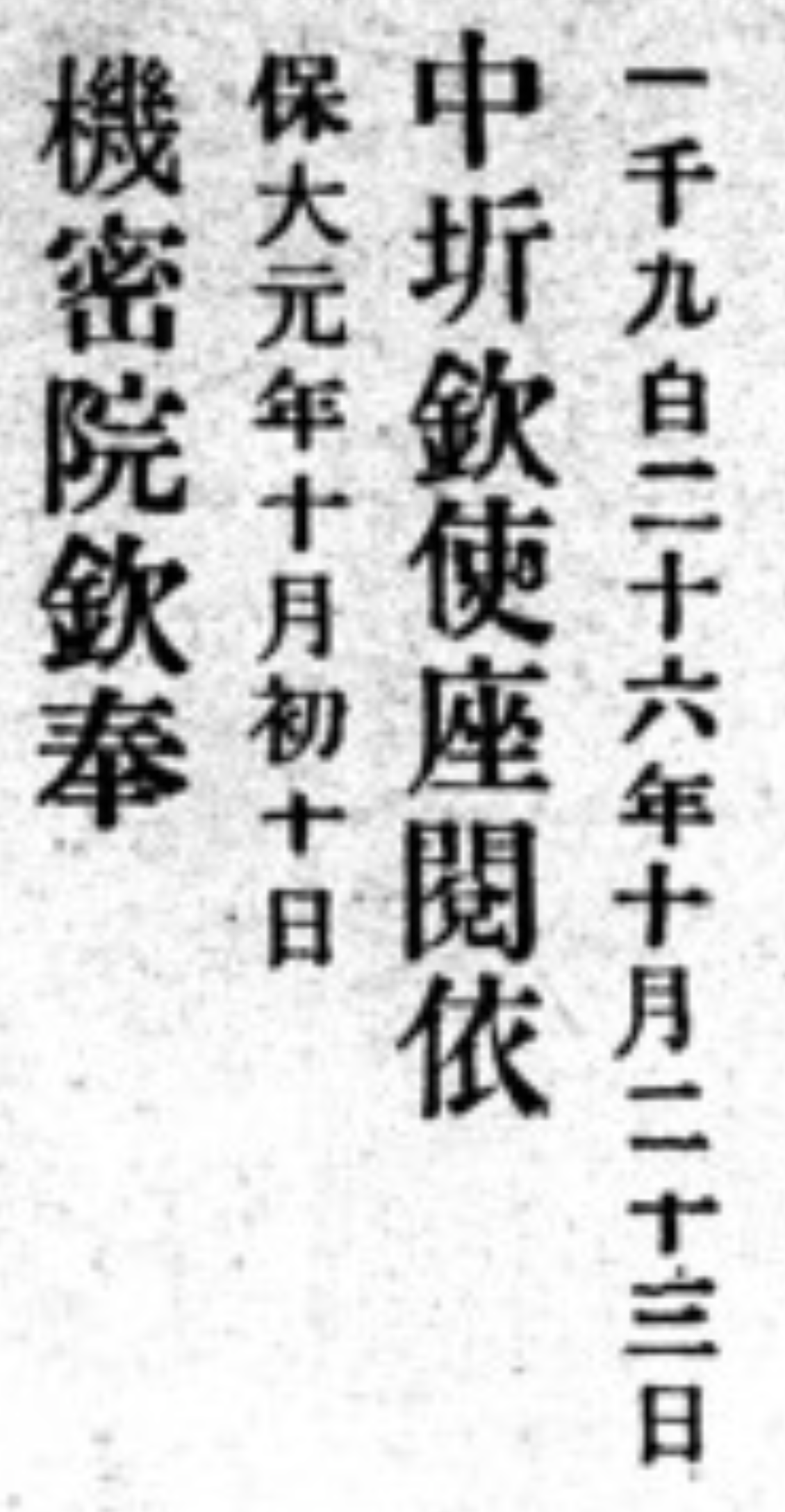
A paper displaying both the titles of the Resident-Superior of Annam and the head of the Viện cơ mật with the Gregorian date (1926-10-23) and the Vietnamese reign era date (Bảo Đại 1-10-初10).

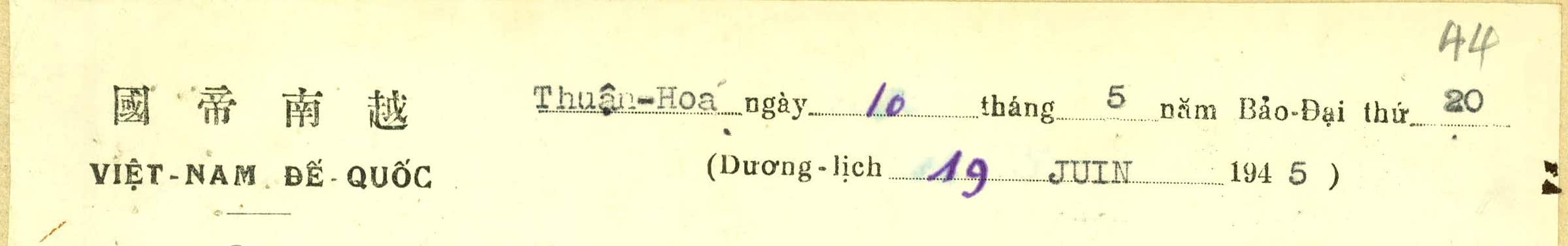
The date on top of a document issued during the Empire of Vietnam period showing both the Vietnamese date (10-05-Bảo Đại 20) and the "Solar" (Gregorian) date (19-06-1945).

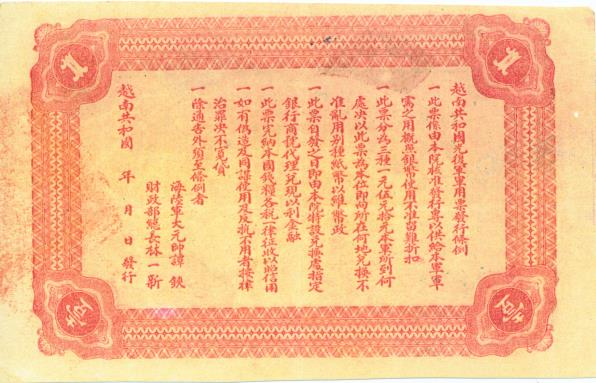
A revolutionary bond using the era name Việt Nam Cộng hòa quốc (越南共和國) which was proposed by the Việt Nam Quang Phục Hội for their proposed the Republic of Vietnam (越南民國), based on the Republic of China calendar.

== See also ==
- Chinese zodiac
- Lunar calendar
- Lunisolar calendar
- Sexagenary cycle
