= Ox (zodiac) =

Sign of the Chinese zodiac

- "Ox" in regular Chinese characters
- Chinese: 牛
Transcriptions
Standard Mandarin
- Hanyu Pinyin: niú
- Wade–Giles: niu^{2}
- IPA: [njǒʊ]
Hakka
- Romanization: ngiù
Yue: Cantonese
- Yale Romanization: ngàuh
- Jyutping: ngau4
- IPA: [ŋɐw˩]
Southern Min
- Hokkien POJ: gû
Eastern Min
- Fuzhou BUC: ngiù
Northern Min
- Jian'ou Romanized: niû
Middle Chinese
- Middle Chinese: ngiu
Old Chinese
- Baxter (1992): *ŋʷjɨ
- Baxter–Sagart (2014): *ŋʷə

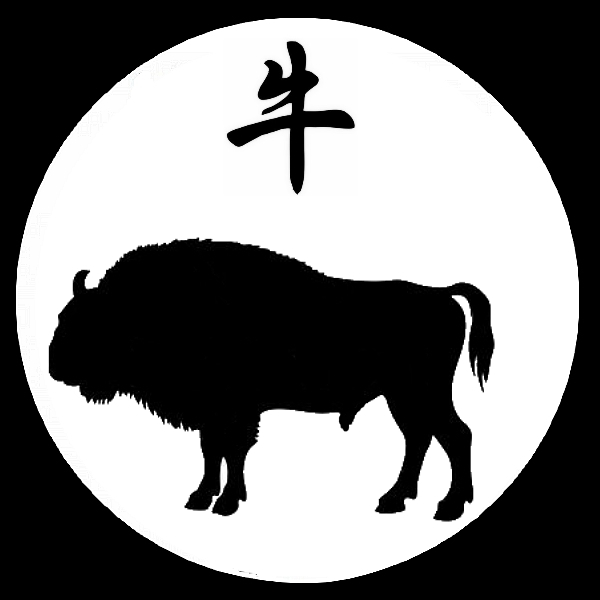
Zodiacal ox, showing the Chinese character niú (牛), meaning "ox" or "bovine creature". The same character is also used in some related languages.

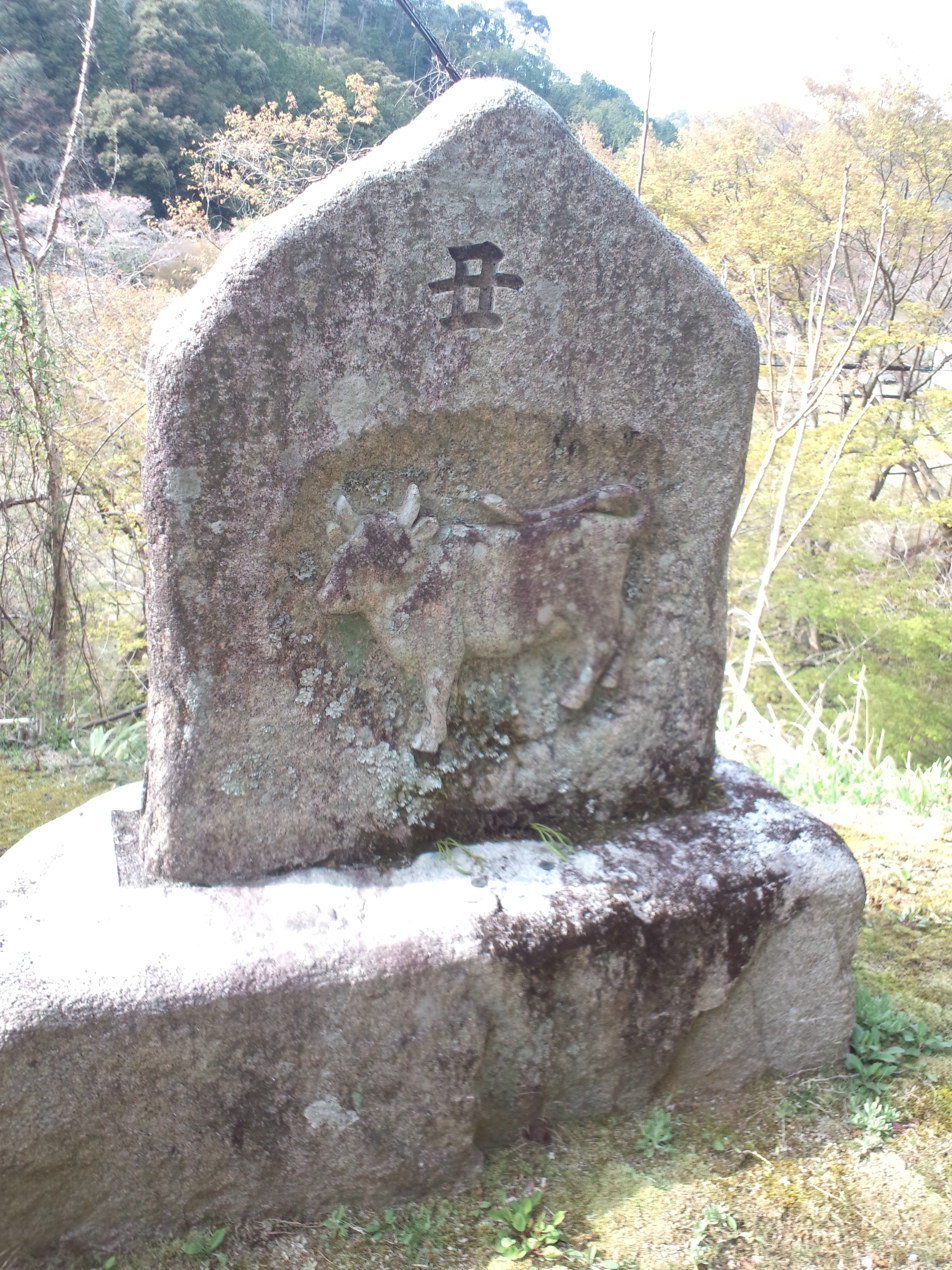
Carving of a bovine animal ("ox"), at Mount Hôrai-ji Buddhist Temple, Aichi Prefecture, Japan: a stone monument showing the Earthly Branch symbol chǒu (丑)

The Ox (牛) is the second of the 12-year periodic sequence (cycle) of animals which appear in the Chinese zodiac related to the Chinese calendar, and also appears in related calendar systems.

The Year of the Ox is also denoted by the Earthly Branch symbol chǒu (丑). There are also a yearly month of the ox and a daily hour of the ox (Chinese double hour, 1:00 a.m. to 3:00 a.m.). Years of the oxen (cows) are cyclically differentiated by correlation to the Heavenly Stems cycle, resulting in a repeating cycle of five years of the ox/cow (over a sixty-year period), each ox/cow year also being associated with one of the Chinese wǔxíng, also known as the "five elements", or "phases": the "Five Phases" being Fire (火 huǒ), Water (水 shuǐ), Wood (木 mù), Metal (金 jīn), and Earth (土 tǔ).

== Etymology ==
The Chinese term translated here as ox is in Chinese niú (牛), a word generally referring to cows, bulls, or neutered types of the bovine family, such as common cattle or water buffalo. By consequence, the zodiacal ox may be construed as male, female, neutered, intersex (formerly referred to as hermaphroditic), and either singular or plural.

== Zodiac ==
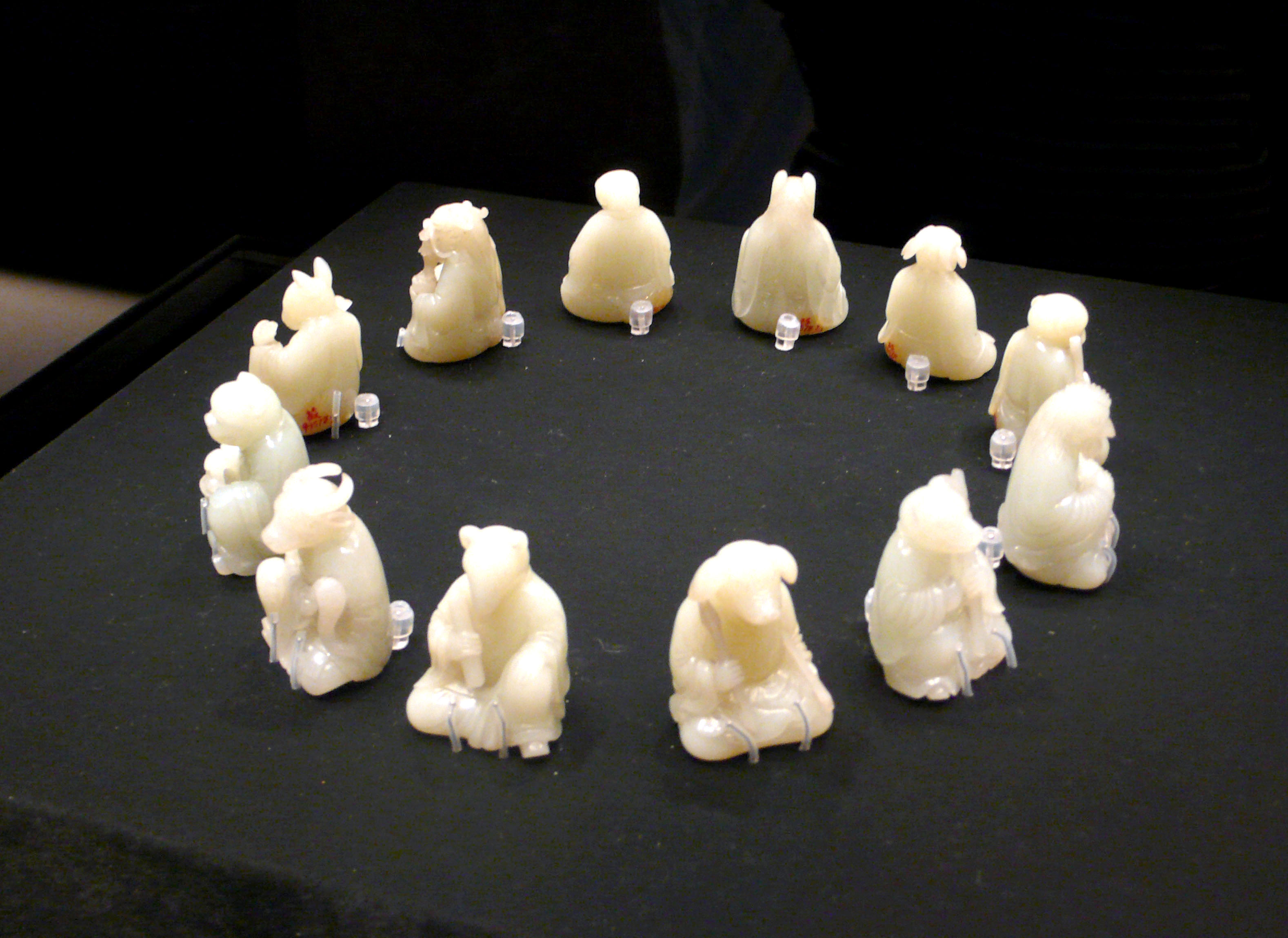
Twelve jade figurines from China representing the zodiacal "circle of small animals", beginning with the rat (left front), and then going clockwise to the next figure on the left (the ox) and then continuing clockwise around to the pig (right front)

The term "zodiacal" refers to the classification scheme based on the lunar calendar that assigns an animal and its reputed attributes to each year in a repeating 12-year cycle. The 12-year cycle is an approximation to the 11.85-year orbital period of Jupiter. Originating from China, this form of the zodiac (with some variations) has been popular for a long time in many East Asian countries, such as Japan, South Korea, Vietnam, Cambodia, and Thailand.

=== Meaning ===
The Ox (牛) is the second of the 12-year periodic sequence (cycle) of animals which appear in the Chinese zodiac related to the Chinese calendar, and also appears in related calendar systems. The Chinese term translated here as ox is in Chinese niú (牛), a word generally referring to cows, bulls, or native varieties of the bovine family, such as the water buffalo in South-East Asia. The zodiacal ox may be construed as male, female, neutered, hermaphroditic, and either singular or plural. The Year of the Ox is also denoted by the Earthly Branch symbol chǒu (丑). The term "zodiac" ultimately derives from an Ancient Greek term referring to a "circle of little animals". There are also a yearly month of the ox and a daily hour of the ox (Chinese double hour, 1:00 a.m. to 3:00 a.m.). Years of the oxen (cows) are cyclically differentiated by correlation to the Heavenly Stems cycle, resulting in a repeating cycle of five years of the ox/cow (over a sixty-year period), each ox/cow year also being associated with one of the Chinese wǔxíng, also known as the "five elements", or "phases": the "Five Phases" being Fire (火 huǒ), Water (水 shuǐ), Wood (木 mù), Metal (金 jīn), and Earth (土 tǔ). The Year of the Ox follows after the Year of the Rat (the first year of the zodiacal cycle) and is followed by the Year of the Tiger.

=== Differences with Western astrology ===
The term "zodiac" reflects similarities and differences with the Western zodiac. Chinese astrology incorporates the five natural elements (Wood, Fire, Earth, Metal, Water) that rotate every two years as it is an agrarian culture studying the climate for optimal growth patterns, combined with Yin and Yang polarities, whereas the Western system stems from the four elements (Fire, Earth, Air, Water) and three modalities that are cardinal, fixed and mutable that is based on a sea fairing culture found in the Greeks and also in Indian systems. All have similarities having cycles divided into twelve parts, with at least the majority of those parts named for animals, and each is widely associated with an ascription of a person's personality or events in their life to a supposed influence of the person's particular relationship to the cycle but the distinction is that the Chinese philosophy is based on destiny and not fatalistic realities. A major difference between the two is that the animals of the Chinese zodiac are not associated with constellations spanned by the ecliptic plane (that is, the part of the sky through which the Sun appears to move from the perspective of Earth). The Chinese/East Asian 12-part cycle corresponds to years, rather than months.

== Mythological ox ==
The ox of the Chinese zodiac has a long history. In Chinese mythology, many myths about oxen or ox-like entities include celestial and earthly beings. The myths range from ones which include oxen or composite beings with ox characteristics as major actors to ones which focus on human or divine actors, in which the role of the oxen are more subsidiary. In some cases, Chinese myths focus on oxen-related subjects, such as plowing and agriculture or ox-powered carriage. Another important role for beef cattle is in the religious capacity of sacrificial offerings. Chinese mythology intersects with the idea of the zodiacal ox.

=== Great race ===
According to some old mythological traditions there was a race held by a great deity to determine which creatures, in which order, would be the namesakes of the twelve-year cycle. The race was run, and swum, the finishing line being across a great river. The Rat and the Ox crossed easily enough, the Ox due to being large, powerful, and adept both on land and in water: the Rat asked the good-natured Ox for a ride on its back, but then ungratefully jumped off at the last minute to cross the finish line first.

== Years and the Five Elements ==
Sexagenary cycle years

People born within these date ranges can be said to have been born in the "Year of the Ox", while bearing the following elemental phase sign:

Start date	End date	Heavenly branch
31 January 1805	17 January 1806	Wood Ox
17 January 1817	4 February 1818	Fire Ox
4 February 1829	24 January 1830	Earth Ox
23 January 1841	9 February 1842	Metal Ox
8 February 1853	28 January 1854	Water Ox
27 January 1865	12 February 1866	Wood Ox
13 February 1877	1 February 1878	Fire Ox
31 January 1889	20 January 1890	Earth Ox
19 February 1901	5 February 1902	Metal Ox
6 February 1913	25 January 1914	Water Ox
24 January 1925	12 February 1926	Wood Ox
11 February 1937	30 January 1938	Fire Ox
29 January 1949	16 February 1950	Earth Ox
15 February 1961	4 February 1962	Metal Ox
3 February 1973	22 January 1974	Water Ox
20 February 1985	8 February 1986	Wood Ox
7 February 1997	27 January 1998	Fire Ox
26 January 2009	13 February 2010	Earth Ox
12 February 2021	31 January 2022	Metal Ox
31 January 2033	18 February 2034	Water Ox
17 February 2045	5 February 2046	Wood Ox
4 February 2057	23 January 2058	Fire Ox
23 January 2069	10 February 2070	Earth Ox
9 February 2081	28 January 2082	Metal Ox
27 January 2093	14 February 2094	Water Ox

== Lunar Mansion ==
In traditional Chinese astrology as well as traditional Chinese astronomy the sky was mapped into various asterisms or what are sometimes referred to as Chinese constellations. This is actually more similar to the zodiac of Western astrology than is the 12 animal cycle. The stars along the plane of the ecliptic divide into groups known as the Twenty-Eight Mansions. Because the moon during its monthly cycle could be observed to appear to move from one mansion (or "camp") into the next each night in turn, they are also known as Lunar Mansions. Traditionally, these mansions were divided into four groups of seven each, and associated with one of four spiritual entities and cardinal directions

This is applicable to the Year of the Ox, Chǒu (丑), a sign linked to the celestial region of the Black Warrior, or Xuánwǔ, linked to the stars of Beta Tauri, in modern astronomy.

== Hour of the Ox ==
Main Chinese tradition divided the hours of a day-night period into 12 double-hours. Each of these double-hours corresponds with one of the twelve signs of the Chinese zodiac, with similar symbolic motif and astrological significance. The first of the twelve double hours is midnight (at the middle of the double-hour), corresponding with 11:00 p.m. to 1:00 a.m.: this is the Hour of the Rat. The second and next double-hour is the Hour of the Ox: 1:00 a.m. to 3:00 a.m.; that is the double-hour chǒu (丑).

== Basic astrology elements ==
Earthly Branches of Birth Year:	丑 Chǒu
The Five Elements:	Earth
Cardinal Point:	North-Northeast (NNE)
Yin/ Yang:	Yin
Lunar Month:	January 8 to February 6
Season:	Winter
Earthly Branch Ruling Hours:	1 a.m. to 3 a.m
Twelve Heavenly Generals:	Sanskrit: Caundhula (Chinese: 招杜羅)
Lucky Flowers:	tulip, evergreen, peach blossom, rose
Lucky Numbers:	8, 3; Avoid: 6, 9
Lucky Colors:	green, red, purple; Avoid: white, blue
Lucky/Associated Countries:	Japan, India, Finland, Switzerland, Lithuania, Hungary

== Around the world ==
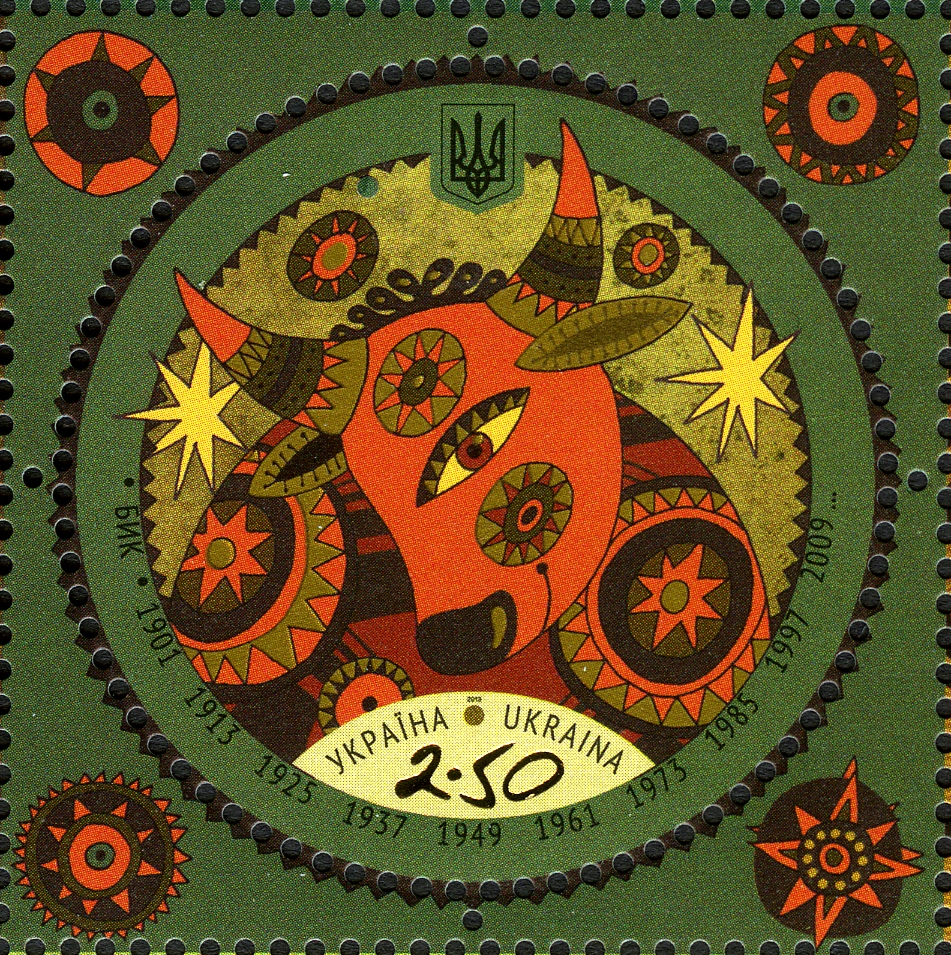
Stamp from a zodiacal series from Ukraine commemorating Years of the Ox

In the Vietnamese zodiac, the water buffalo occupies the position of the Ox. In Nepal, the Tamu/Gurung people celebrate the year of the cow.

== See also ==
- Bovidae in Chinese mythology
- Burmese zodiac
- Chinese astrology
- Chinese calendar
- Ox
- Ox in Chinese mythology
- Tibetan calendar
- Water buffalo (zodiac)
