= Burmese zodiac =

Astrological classifications

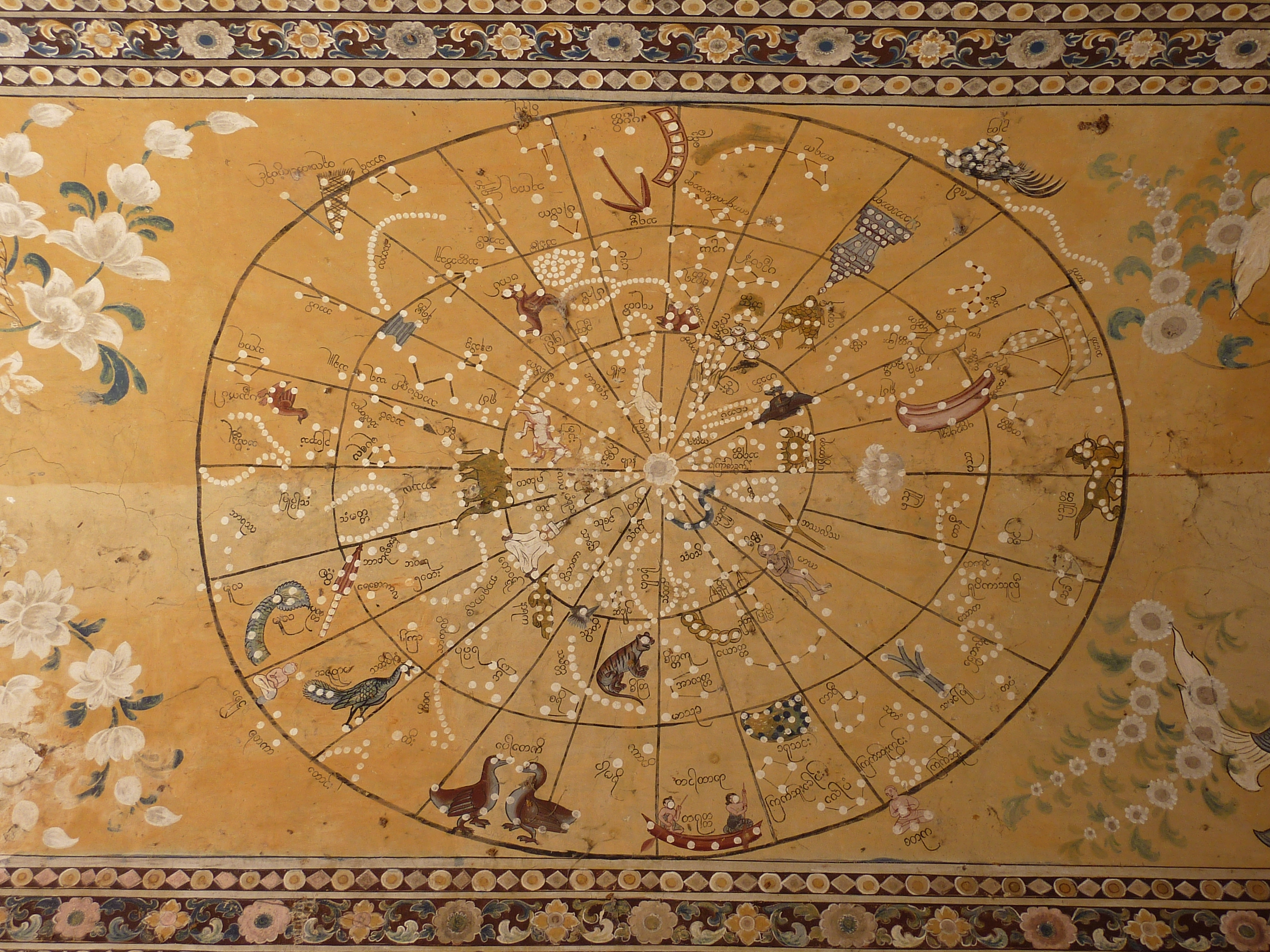
A painted ceiling at Kyauktawgyi Pagoda depicting the Burmese zodiac

The Burmese zodiac (Burmese: ဇာတာ ရာသီခွင် [zàdà jàðì ɡwɪ̀ɰ̃]) is the traditional Burmese system of astronomy and astrology. While it is still an important component of the Burmese calendar, today, the zodiac is closely identified with Burmese astrology, called Baydin (ဗေဒင်). Largely derived from Hindu astronomy and Vedic astrology, the Burmese zodiac consists of not only the same 12 signs of the Western zodiac but also 27 lunar mansions of the month and eight weekday signs.

== Structure ==
=== Seasons ===
The Burmese zodiac, like the Western zodiac, is divided into 12 signs called yathi (ရာသီ [jàðì]). The Burmese signs are identical to Indian and Western signs as they were derived from Indian and ultimately Western zodiac. Each yathi is divided into 30 degrees (အင်္သာ [ɪ̀ɰ̃ðà]); each degree into 60 minutes (လိတ္တာ [leiʔtà]); and each minute into 60 seconds (ဝိလိတ္တာ [wḭleiʔtà]).

Longitude အင်္သာ	Sign ရာသီ	Sanskrit	Latin	Ruling planet ရာသီခွင်
0°	Meittha မိဿ	Meṣa मेष	Aries	Mars
30°	Pyeittha ပြိဿ	Vṛṣabha वृषभ	Taurus	Venus
60°	Mehton မေထုန်	Mithuna मिथुन	Gemini	Mercury
90°	Karakat ကရကဋ်	Karkaṭa कर्कट	Cancer	Moon
120°	Thein သိဟ်	Siṃha सिंह	Leo	Sun
150°	Kan ကန်	Kanyā कन्या	Virgo	Mercury
180°	Tu တူ	Tulā तुला	Libra	Venus
210°	Byeissa ဗြိစ္ဆာ	Vṛścika वृश्चिक	Scorpio	Mars
240°	Danu ဓနု	Dhanuṣa धनुष	Sagittarius	Jupiter
270°	Makara မကာရ	Makara मकर	Capricorn	Saturn
300°	Kon ကုံ	Kumbha कुम्भ	Aquarius	Saturn
330°	Mein မိန်	Mīna मीन	Pisces	Jupiter

=== Lunar mansions ===
The zodiac month consists of 27 days, approximating the mean sidereal month of 27.321661 days. Thus each zodiac day, called nekkhat (နက္ခတ် [nɛʔkʰaʔ]), represents a lunar mansion, or a segment of the ecliptic along which the Moon revolves around the Earth. Though the names are Burmese adaptations of Sanskrit names, the Burmese system is not the same as the modern Indian system. The Burmese system uses unequal spaces for each segment (from 5° to 26°), and the first segment, Athawani, begins at 350° longitude. The modern Indian system uses equal segments of 13° 20' (360° divided by 27), and the first segment, Asvini, begins at 0°. (The zodiac also recognizes a lost 28th constellation, called Abizi (အဘိဇိ; Sanskrit: Abhijit), which apparently made one revolution among these stars in 27 to 28 days.)

The nekkhats are usually used to calculate the zata (horoscope) of a person or an event. Many historical dates were represented with the nekkhat position, not with the more common calendrical date. (Note: See the Zatadawbon Yazawin chronicle (Zata 1960) to see how nekkhats are used to represent kings' birthdays and important events.)

Day	Burmese	Sanskrit	Extent	Range
1	Athawani အဿဝဏီ	Aśvinī	18°	350°–8°
2	Barani ဘရဏီ	Bharaṇī	10°	8°–18°
3	Kyattika ကြတ္တိကာ	Kṛttikā	16°	18°–34°
4	Yawhani ရောဟဏီ	Rohiṇī	12°	34°–46°
5	Migathi မိဂသီ	Mṛgaśira	14°	46°–60°
6	Adra အဒြ	Ārdrā	5°	60°–65°
7	Ponnahpukshu ပုဏ္ဏဖုသျှု	Punarvasu	27°	65°–92°
8	Hpusha ဖုသျှ	Puṣya	14°	92°–106°
9	Athaleiktha အသလိဿ	Āśleṣā	12°	106°–118°
10	Maga မာဃ	Māgha	11°	118°–129°
11	Pyobba Baragonni ပြုဗ္ဗာ ဘရဂုဏ္ဏီ	Pūrva Phālgunī	16°	129°–145°
12	Ottara Baragonni ဥတ္တရာ ဘရဂုဏ္ဏီ	Uttara Phālgunī	9°	145°–154°
13	Hathada ဟဿဒ	Hasta	10°	154°–164°
14	Seiktra စိတြ	Citra	15°	164°–179°
15	Thwati သွာတိ	Svāti	13°	179°–192°
16	Withaka ဝိသာခါ	Viśākhā	21°	192°–213°
17	Anuyada အနုရာဓ	Anurādha	11°	213°–224°
18	Zehta ဇေဋ္ဌ	Jyeṣṭha	5°	224°–229°
19	Mula မူလ	Mula	13°	229°–242°
20	Pyobba Than ပြုဗ္ဗာသဠ်	Pūrva Āṣādhā	15°	242°–257°
21	Ottara Than ဥတ္တရာသဠ်	Uttara Āṣādhā	5°	257°–262°
22	Tharawun သရဝဏ်	Śravaṇa	13°	262°–275°
23	Danatheikda ဓနသိဒ္ဓ	Dhaniṣṭha	12°	275°–287°
24	Thattabeiksha သတ္တဘိသျှ	Satabhiṣā	26°	287°–313°
25	Pyobba Parabaik ပြုဗ္ဗာ ပုရပိုက်	Pūrva Bhādrapadā	10°	313°–323°
26	Ottara Parabaik ဥတ္တရာ ပုရပိုက်	Uttara Bhādrapadā	16°	323°–339°
27	Yewati ရေဝတီ	Revatī	11°	339°–350°

=== Weekdays ===
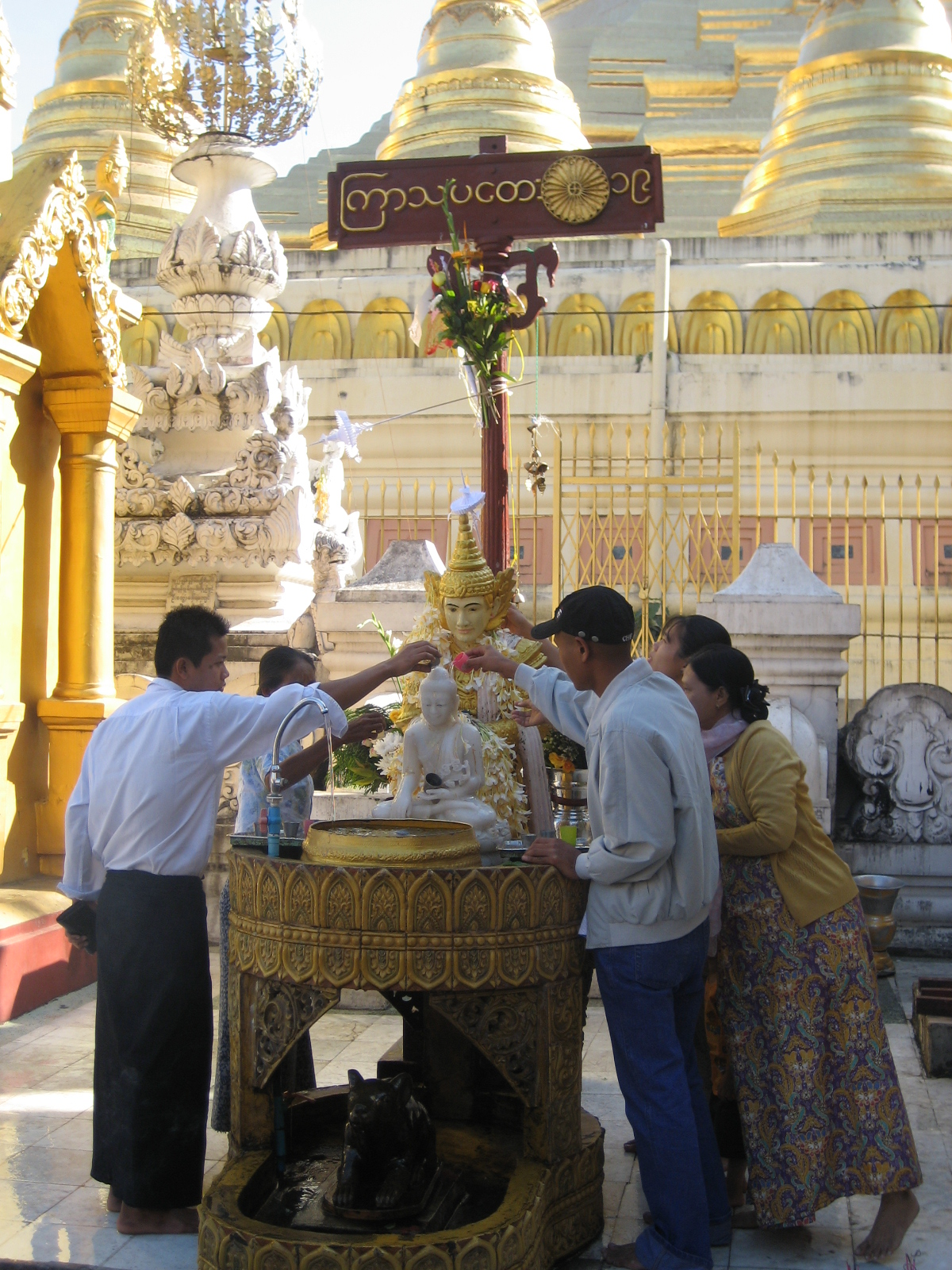
The Jupiter planetary post at the Shwedagon Pagoda, with the representative vehicle of the rat underneath

The Burmese zodiac employs eight signs in a seven-day week, with each sign representing its own day, cardinal direction, planet (celestial body) and animal; (Note: Certain letters of the Burmese alphabet are assigned to these 7 days, and names starting with the respective letter are given to children born on the respective day.) it is known as the "Mahabote zodiac". The zodiacs, with slight variations, are also found in Sri Lanka and Thailand.

Cardinal direction	Burmese	Sanskrit	English	Planet	Sign (Myanmar)	Sign (Sri Lanka)	Sign (Thailand)
Northeast	Taninganwe တနင်္ဂနွေ	Āditya	Sunday	Sun	Garuda ဂဠုန်	Horse අශ්වයා குதிரை	Monkey ลิง
East	Taninla တနင်္လာ	Candra	Monday	Moon	Tiger ကျား	Elephant අලියා யானை	Horse ม้า
Southeast	Inga အင်္ဂါ	Angāraka	Tuesday	Mars	Lion ခြင်္သေ့	Peacock මොනරා மயில்	Buffalo ควาย
South	Boddahu ဗုဒ္ဓဟူး	Budha	Wednesday a.m.	Mercury	Tusked elephant ဆင်	Buffalo මී හරකෙක් எருமை	Elephant ช้าง
Northwest	Rahu ရာဟု	Rāhu	Wednesday p.m.	Ascending Lunar node	Tuskless elephant ဟိုင်း	Donkey බූරුවා கழுதை	Garuda ครุฑ
West	Kyathabade ကြာသပတေး	Bṛhaspati	Thursday	Jupiter	Rat ကြွက်	Lion සිංහයා சிங்கம்	Deer กวาง
North	Thaukkya သောကြာ	Śukra	Friday	Venus	Guinea pig (Note: (Htin Aung 1959: 12): In Shan tradition, Friday's sign is the Ox.) ပူး	Bull ගොනා காளை	Ox วัว
Southwest	Sanay စနေ	Śani	Saturday	Saturn	Nāga နဂါး	Crow/Raven කපුට காகம்	Tiger เสือ

While the eight signs are the most prevalent in modern Burmese zodiac, the zodiac officially also recognizes a ninth sign called Ketu (ကိတ် [keiʔ]), which rules over all of the signs. The same sign also appears in Sri Lanka and Thailand under the same name. Ketu's sign is a mythical Animal of Five Beauties called pyinsarupa (ပဉ္စရူပ [pjɪ̀ɴsa̰ jùpa̰]) with the antlers of a deer, the tusks and the trunk of an elephant, the mane of a lion, the body of a naga serpent, and the tail of a fish. Moreover, Rahu and Ketu, while borrowed from Hindu astrology, are different from their original versions. Hindu astrology considers Rahu and Ketu to be the ascending and descending lunar nodes but Burmese astrology considers them distinct planets.

At any rate, the inclusion of Ketu is not due to astronomical necessity but rather cultural. (J.C. Eade points out that "there is no astronomical necessity" for Ketu, whose orbit can be derived from the value of Rahu, and suggests that Ketu was "superfluous to the system, and perhaps even as an entity that owes its origin to a mistake". Htin Aung says the use of Rahu and Ketu in Burmese zodiac and astrology is for cultural, not necessarily astronomical, value, noting that the nine signs neatly fit the Nine Gods of Burmese animist tradition and indeed are an essential part of the "Ceremony of the Nine Gods" usually held when there is sickness in the house.)

The signs can be represented in a nine-square diagram. The exact arrangement is used to place the planetary figurines in the "Ceremony of the Nine Gods", with Ketu in the center, right behind a statue of the Buddha. All the planetary figures face the Buddha (as the animist practice has been absorbed into Burmese Buddhism).

Northwest; Wednesday evening Rahu; Tuskless elephant	North; Friday; Venus; Guinea pig	Northeast; Sunday; Sun; Garuda
West; Thursday; Jupiter; Rat	Center; Week; Ketu; Pyinsa Rupa	East; Monday; Moon; Tiger
Southwest; Saturday; Saturn; Naga	South; Wednesday morning Mercury; Tusked elephant	Southeast; Tuesday; Mars; Lion

The Sunday, Tuesday, Saturday and Rahu planets are considered to be Malefics, or planets with an evil influence while the Monday, Wednesday, Thursday and Friday planets are considered Benefics, or planets with benign influence. Ketu is considered to be the most powerful and a Benefic but as the chief planet, it cannot be grouped with any other planet. However, modern Burmese astrology rarely uses Ketu, and tends to use only the other eight planets.

== See also ==
- Burmese calendar#Cycle
- Burmese culture

== Bibliography ==
- Eade, J.C. (1989). Southeast Asian Ephemeris: Solar and Planetary Positions, A.D. 638–2000. Ithaca: Cornell University. ISBN 0-87727-704-4.
- Eade, J.C. (1995). The Calendrical Systems of Mainland South-East Asia (illustrated ed.). Brill. ISBN 9789004104372.
- Htin Aung, Maung (1959). Folk Elements in Burmese Buddhism. Rangoon: Department of Religious Affairs.
- Irwin, Sir Alfred Macdonald Bulteel (1909). The Burmese and Arakanese calendars. Rangoon: Hanthawaddy Printing Works.
- Luce, G.H. (1970). Old Burma: Early Pagan. Vol. 2. Locust Valley, NY: Artibus Asiae and New York University.
