= Fangfeng =

Fangfeng (traditional Chinese: 防風; simplified Chinese: 防风; pinyin: Fángfēng) is a character from Chinese mythology as well as a god in Chinese popular religion. As a mythological figure, Fangfeng is mostly known for arriving late for an assembly called by Yu the Great after the end of the Great Flood and then being executed at the orders of Yu. Because Fangfeng was a giant (of nearly 33 feet), the executioner had to build a large dike in order to reach his head. Modern myths and legends regarding Fangfeng in China tend to emphasize that Fangfeng was wrongly executed; that the reason Fangfeng was late for the assembly was that on his way there he encountered a local flood and his delay was caused by his efforts to end the flood and save the people. As a god, worship of Fangfeng was most prominent in the Six Dynasties regions of Wu and Yue (modern Zhejiang, Jiangsu, and Shanghai). A common depiction of Fangfeng was that of a giant with one eye and brow with the head of a dragon, and the ears of an ox.
