= Rabbit (zodiac) =

Sign of the Chinese zodiac

- "Rabbit" in regular Chinese characters
- Chinese: 兔
Transcriptions
Standard Mandarin
- Hanyu Pinyin: tù
- Wade–Giles: t'u^{4}
- IPA: [tʰû]
Hakka
- Romanization: thu
Yue: Cantonese
- Yale Romanization: tou
- Jyutping: tou3
- IPA: [tʰɔw˧]
Southern Min
- Hokkien POJ: thò͘
Eastern Min
- Fuzhou BUC: tó
Northern Min
- Jian'ou Romanized: tu̿
Old Chinese
- Baxter–Sagart (2014): *l̥ˤa-s

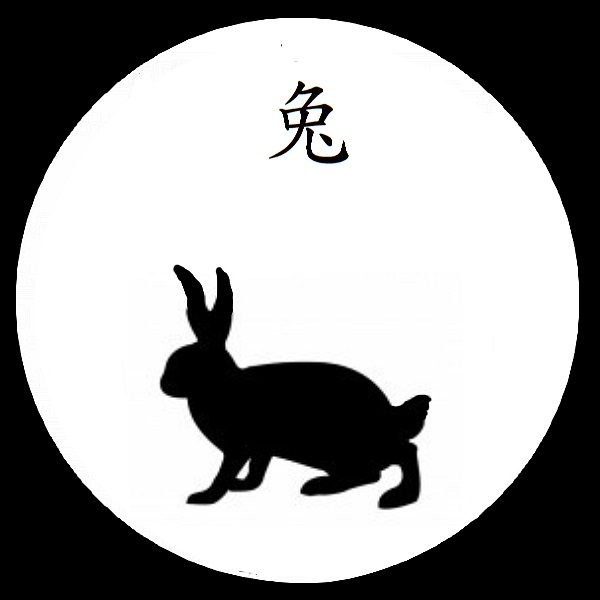
Zodiac Rabbit, showing the tù (兔) character for Rabbit

The Rabbit or Hare is the fourth in the twelve-year periodic sequence (cycle) of animals that appear in the Chinese zodiac related to the Chinese calendar. The Year of the Rabbit or Year of the Hare is associated with the Earthly Branch symbol 卯. the element Wood in Wuxing theory and within Traditional Chinese medicine the Liver Yin and the emotions and virtues of kindness and hope. Both rabbits and hares are called 兔 in Chinese. However, rabbits were not introduced to China until the 16th century, and hares were the only leporids in China when the Chinese zodiac was invented.

In the Vietnamese zodiac and the Gurung zodiac, the cat takes the place of the rabbit/hare. In the Malay zodiac, the mousedeer takes the place of the rabbit/hare.

== Years and elements ==
People born within these date ranges can be said to have been born in the "Year of the Rabbit", while also bearing the following elemental sign:

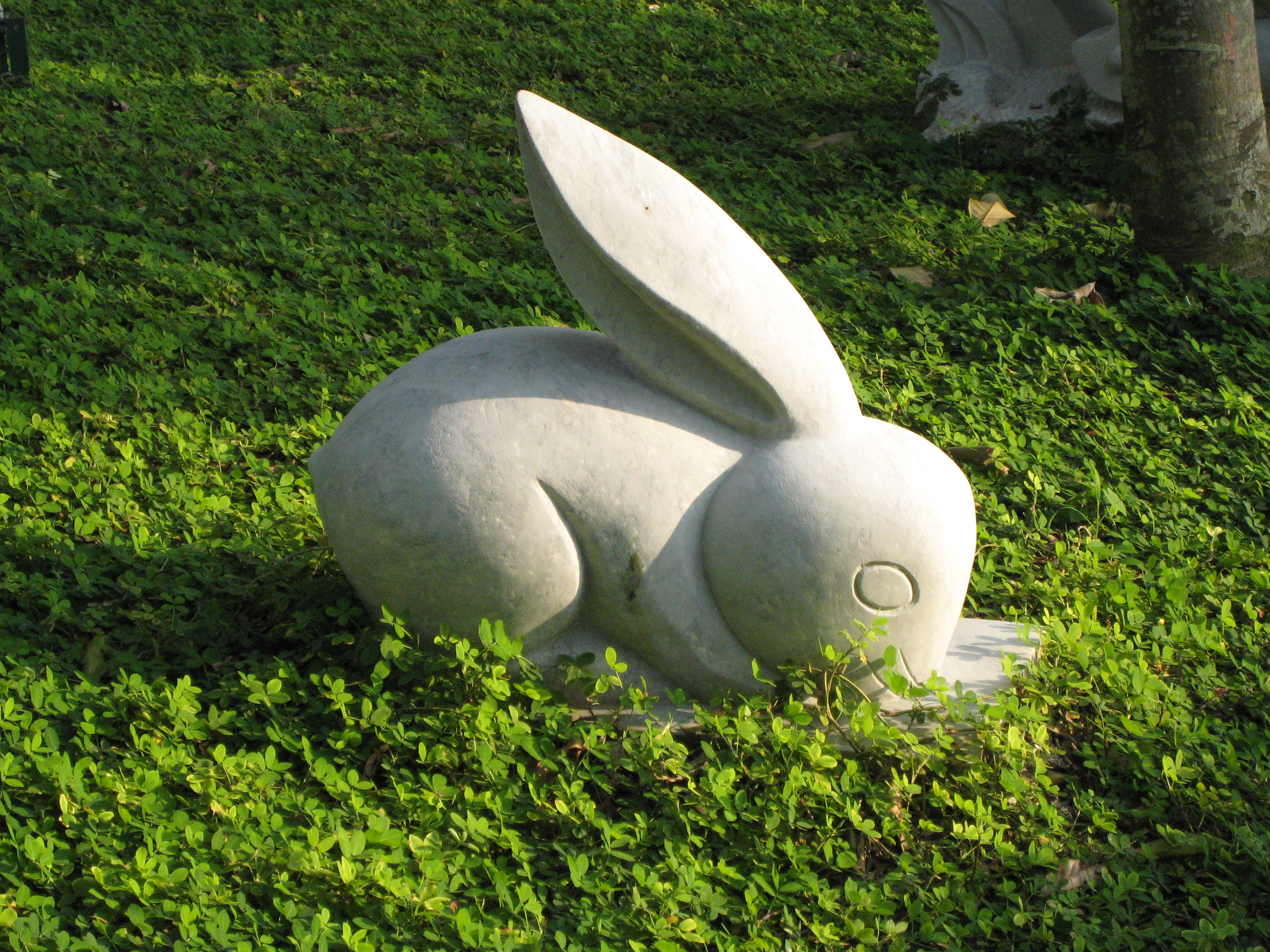
White Rabbit figure in stone.

| Start date | End date | Heavenly branch |
|---|---|---|
| 29 January 1903 | 15 February 1904 | Water Rabbit |
| 14 February 1915 | 3 February 1916 | Wood Rabbit |
| 2 February 1927 | 22 January 1928 | Fire Rabbit |
| 19 February 1939 | 7 February 1940 | Earth Rabbit |
| 6 February 1951 | 26 January 1952 | Metal Rabbit |
| 25 January 1963 | 12 February 1964 | Water Rabbit |
| 11 February 1975 | 30 January 1976 | Wood Rabbit |
| 29 January 1987 | 16 February 1988 | Fire Rabbit |
| 16 February 1999 | 4 February 2000 | Earth Rabbit |
| 3 February 2011 | 22 January 2012 | Metal Rabbit |
| 22 January 2023 | 9 February 2024 | Water Rabbit |
| 8 February 2035 | 27 January 2036 | Wood Rabbit |
| 26 January 2047 | 13 February 2048 | Fire Rabbit |
| 11 February 2059 | 1 February 2060 | Earth Rabbit |
| 31 January 2071 | 18 February 2072 | Metal Rabbit |
| 17 February 2083 | 5 February 2084 | Water Rabbit |
| 5 February 2095 | 24 January 2096 | Wood Rabbit |

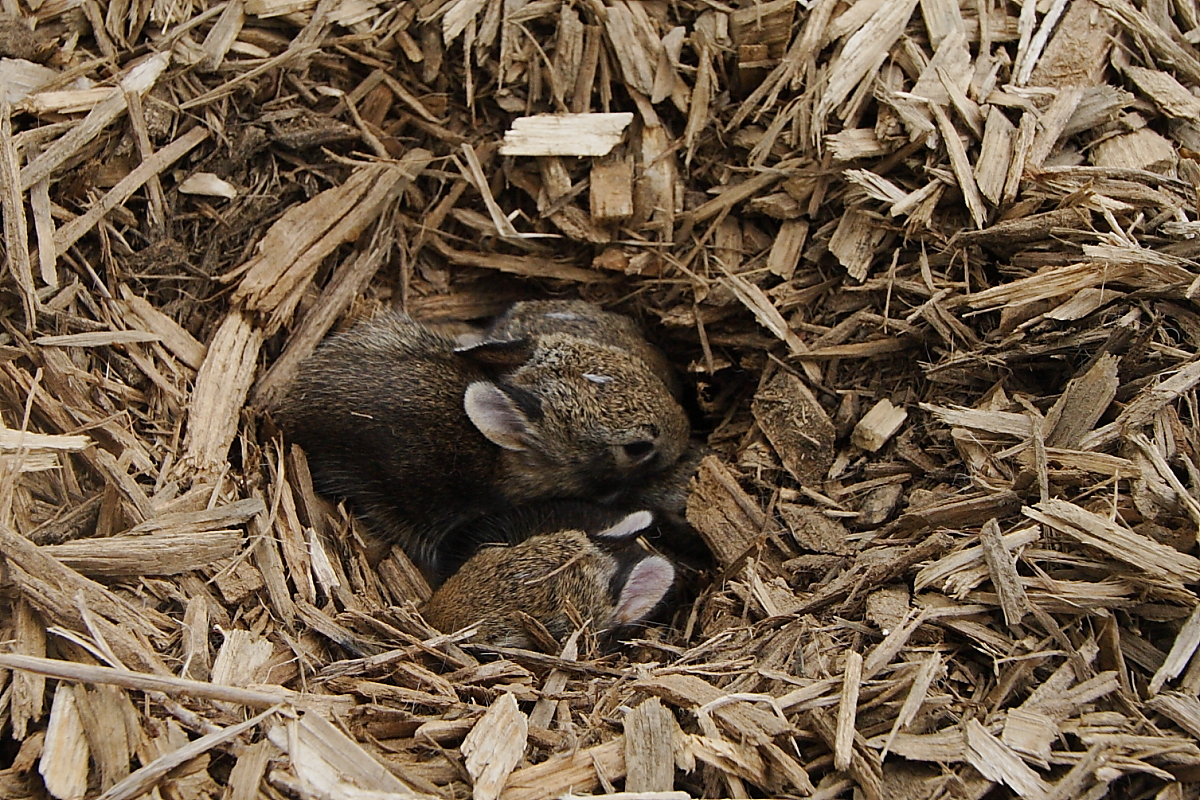
A nest containing baby Rabbits

== Basic astrological associations ==
| Earthly branch: | 卯 Mǎo |
| Element: | Wood |
| Yin Yang: | Yin |
| Lunar month: | March 7 to April 5 |
| Cardinal Point: | East (E) |
| Earthly Branch Ruling Hours: | 5 a.m. to 7 a.m. |
| Lucky numbers: | 3, 4, 6 |
| Lucky flowers: | Plantago, nerve plant, snapdragon |
| Lucky colors: | Pink, purple, grey, red; Avoid: brown, yellow, white |
| Season: | Spring |
| Lucky/Associated Countries: | Croatia, Latvia, Syria, Chile, Cambodia, Oman |

== See also ==
- Rabbit
- Moon rabbit
- Niiname-no-Matsuri
