= Water buffalo (zodiac) =

Sign of the Vietnamese zodiac

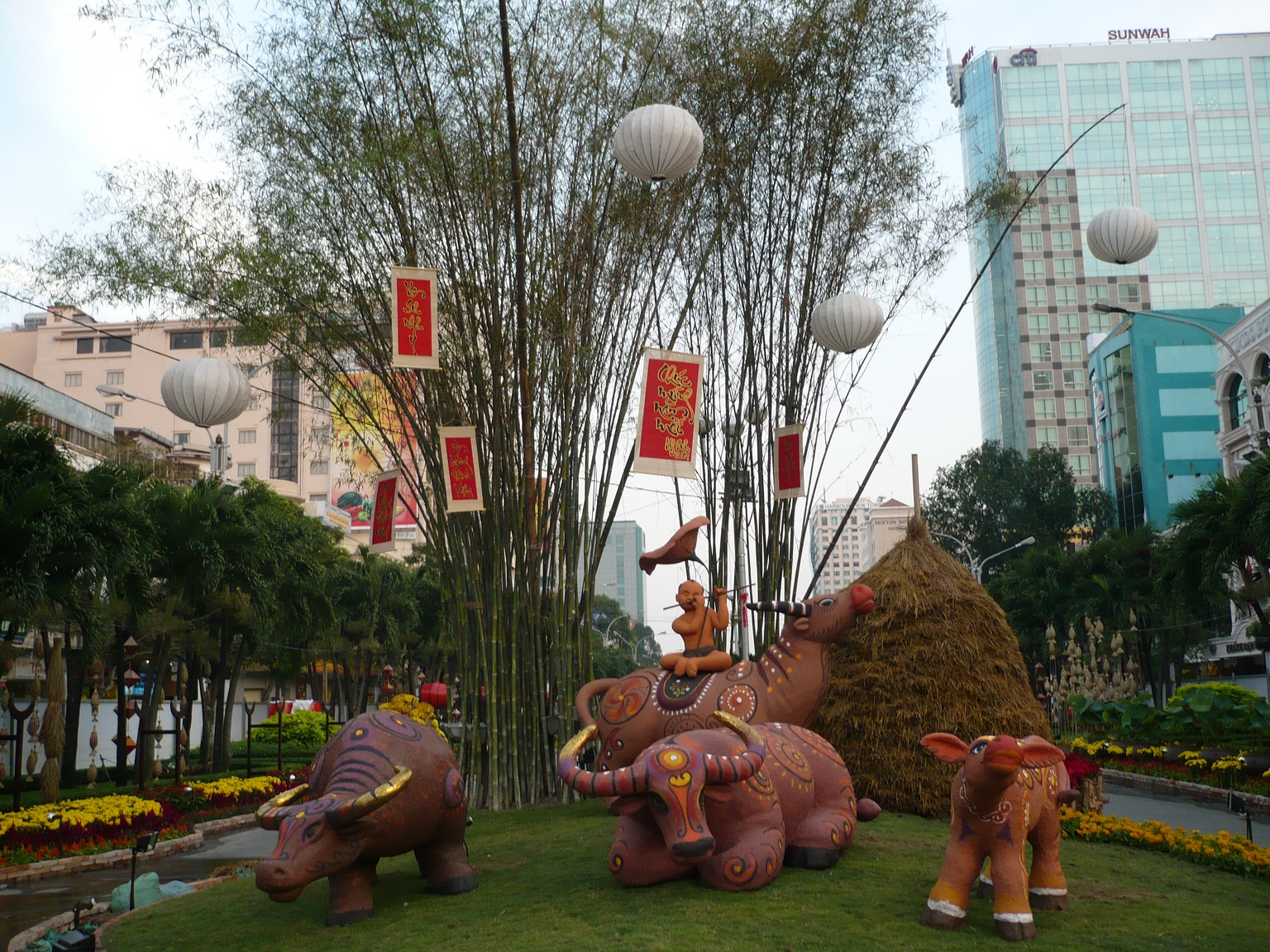
Nguyễn Huệ Street Tết Kỷ Sửu 2009

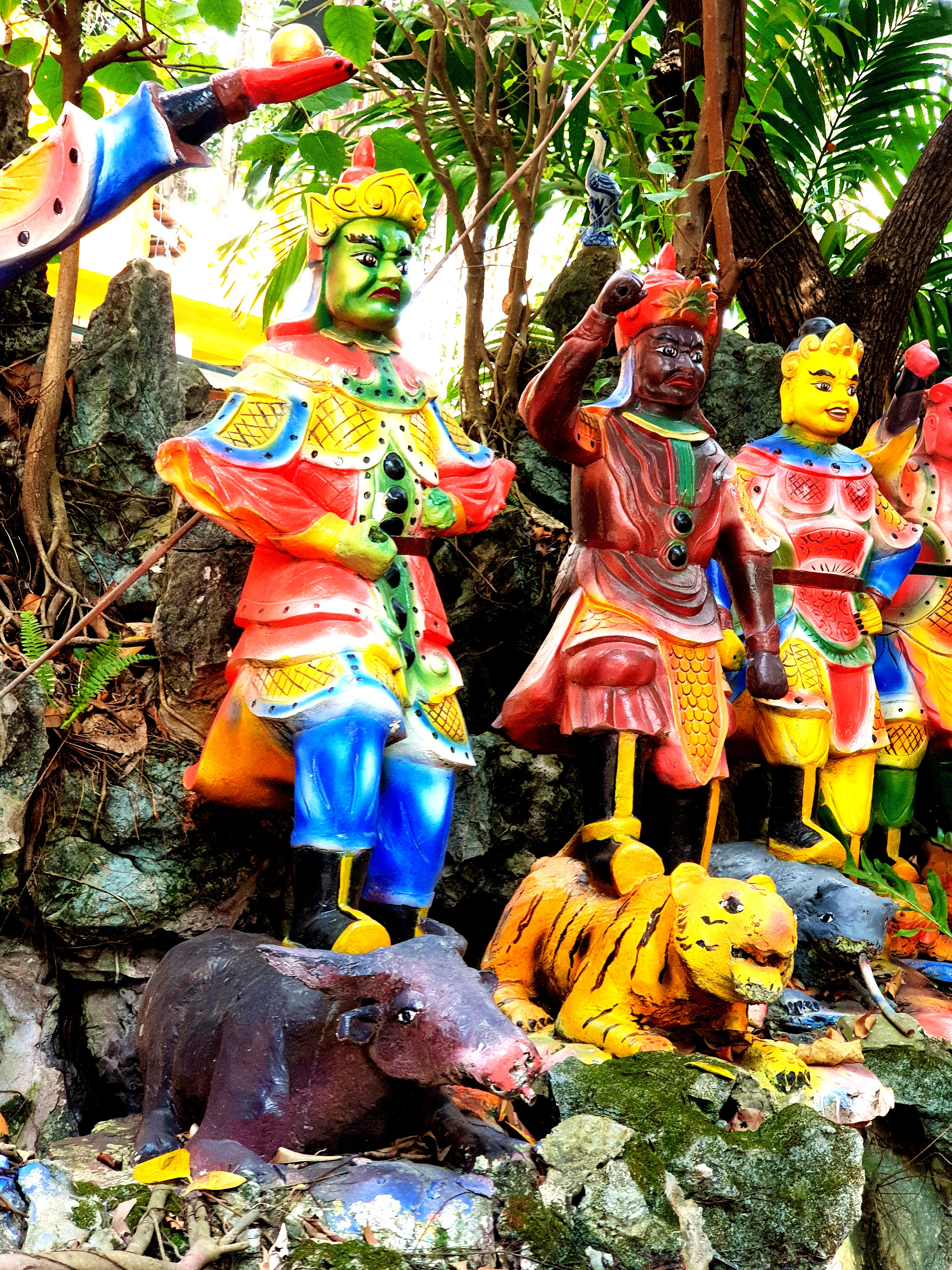
Bufalo zodiac statue in Pháp Giới Temple

The buffalo is the second animal symbol in the 12-year cycle of the Vietnamese zodiac, taking the place of the Ox in the Chinese zodiac. Water buffalo are industrious and patient. In general, the year is slow and steady, appropriate for scientists. The hours of the buffalo are from 1 to 3 am.

== See also ==
- Chinese zodiac
- Burmese zodiac
- Ox
- Ox in Chinese mythology
