= Vietnamese zodiac =

Traditional Vietnamese lunar calendar classification scheme

The Vietnamese zodiac (Vietnamese: Mười hai con giáp) is the traditional Vietnamese classification scheme based on the lunar calendar that assigns an animal and its reputed attributes to each year in a repeating 12-year cycle. The Viet lunar calendar is divided into 60-year cycles known as hồi. Each of these consists of five 12-year animal cycles.

== Zodiac ==
The Vietnamese zodiac is originated from the Chinese zodiac in its usage and arrangement of animals, but replaces the ox with the water buffalo, and the rabbit with the cat. The Vietnamese zodiac uses cat instead of rabbit due to the pronunciation of the rabbit in Chinese writing: 卯 is very similar to the Vietnamese word Mèo for cat.

Zodiac animal sign	Vietnamese zodiac	Characteristic
Rat	Tý	Welcomed as a bringer of good luck
Water buffalo	Sửu	Associated with riches achieved through hard work
Tiger	Dần	Warm-hearted yet fearsome, and brave in the face of danger
Cat	Mão	Known to be tranquil, realistic, intelligent and artistic
Dragon	Thìn	Imperial symbol, associated with the male element yang
Snake	Tỵ	Enigmatic, wise, and like to live well
Horse	Ngọ	Signifies freedom and confidence
Goat	Mùi	Associated with creativity and good taste
Monkey	Thân	Versatile and mischievous; associated with inventors, entertainers, and anything ingenious
Rooster	Dậu	Brave and resilient, but can also be self-absorbed and pretentious
Dog	Tuất	Considered lucky, loyal, and likeable
Pig	Hợi	Honest, patient, and also associated with virility

== See also ==
- Tết
- Vietnamese calendar
- Vietnamese dragon

== Bibliography ==
- Sterling, Richard (2011). DK Eyewitness Travel Guide: Vietnam and Angkor Wat. Penguin. ISBN 978-0-75668-740-3.
- Taylor, K. W. (2018). Essays Into Vietnamese Pasts. Cornell University Press. ISBN 978-1-50171-899-1.
- Noppe, Catherine; Hubert, Jean-François (2018). Art of Vietnam. Parkstone International. ISBN 978-1-78310-725-4.
