= Fire (wuxing) =

Second of five elements of Wuxing

In Chinese philosophy, fire (Chinese: 火; pinyin: huǒ) is one of the five elements that form the wuxing.

Fire is seen traditionally as the symbol of old yang with in the principles of the philosophy of Yin and yang. Its motion is expanding, moving upwards and warming, this can be seen in the energy of fermenting, ripening, convection and the foundational principle behind adaption.

Fire is associated with Summer, the South In the northern hemisphere and North in the Southern hemisphere and the planet Mars, the color red (associated with extreme luck), hot weather, daylight, and the Vermilion Bird (Zhu Que) in the Four Symbols.

There is debate based on the logic of fire, summer and the south as to whether Chinese stems and branches medicine and feng shui should be changed for the southern hemisphere.

== Attributes ==
In Traditional Chinese Medicine, Fire is associated with the Heart, the Emperor or Sovereignty, and therefore Virtue. Its attributes are considered to be dynamism, spontaneity, and enlightenment; however, it is also connected to restlessness when out of balance and burning out of control. The fire element provides warmth, connection, enthusiasm, and creativity; however, when in excess or deficiency, it can bring cold emotional responses or hot tempered behaviour including lack of joy, hatred, impatience, and impulsive behaviour. In the same way, fire provides heat and warmth; however, an excess can also burn too bright leading to dehydration, listlessness, and exhaustion. Fire is the prosper of the matter, or the matter's prosperity stage.

The organs associated with the Fire element are the Triple Heater, Heart and by extension the cardiovascular system (yin), small intestine (yang), tongue and a body's pulse. It is associated with the Spirit of the Shen (神).

== Chinese Traditions ==
This philosophical element plays an important role in Traditional Chinese medicine including the art of acupuncture, herbology astrology and feng shui. Fire is included in the 10 heavenly stems (the five elements in their yin and yang forms), which combine with the 12 Earthly Branches (or Chinese signs of the zodiac), to form the 60 year cycle.

Within the traditional theory of acupuncture the fire element points are called Ying-Spring points on Yin meridians, and Jing-River points on Yang meridians within the Five phase system of traditional medicine.

Yang Fire years end in 6 (e.g. 1976). (Yang years end in an even number.)

Yin Fire years end in 7 (e.g. 1977). (Yin years end in an odd number.)

Fire governs the Chinese zodiac signs Snake and Horse.

Flying Star Feng Shui uses number 9 to represent Fire. The current 20-year cycle from 2024 to 2044 (Period 9) is governed by star 9 fire.

The South corner releases energy of Fire as I Ching and Feng Shui states. It is generally referred as energy of destroying and rebuilding.

Fire/red traditionally symbolizes happiness, relating to a luck, love and life, this is why traditionally Chinese brides wear red for their wedding gowns.

== Cycles of Wu Xing ==
In the regenerative cycle of Wu Xing, Venerable Xiè'ēn a Chinese Tao Buddhist monk physician explains that wood engenders Fire as "fire is generated by wood, as wood is life and movement, life and movement produce heat therefore Fire, the two main constituents of life". Fire at the same time it produces the worth in the form of minerals through ash, this intensifies heat and dries up excessive water and fluids to give integrity and stability to earth.

In the restraining or in excess also called the conquest cycle, the Wisdom of water helps to cool the Heart fire so as to not burn out by overreacting in daily life as "nothing will rationalize desire as water's wisdom."; Fire regulates metal's tendency to be cut off and aloof from people and life, when fire is in excess it overcomes metal's ability to have form and structure by affecting its self-righteousness. Thus, metal's ability to stay straight and true becomes compromised.
