= Water (wuxing) =

Fifth of five classical Chinese elements

In Chinese philosophy, water (Chinese: 水; pinyin: shuǐ) is one of the five concepts that conform the wuxing. It is the low point of matter, and is considered matter's dying or hiding stage.

Among the five elements, water is the old yin symbol of the yinyang character. Its motion is downward and inward, and its energy is stillness and conserving.

Water is associated with the color black or dark blue in traditional Chinese medicine, the planet Mercury (which was believed to cause the dew to fall at night), night, the north, winter or cold weather, and the Black Tortoise (Xuan Wu) in the Four Symbols of Chinese constellations.

== Attributes ==
In Chinese Taoist thought, water is representative of intelligence and wisdom, flexibility, softness, and pliancy; however, an overabundance of the element is said to cause difficulty in choosing something and sticking to it. In the same way, water can be fluid and weak, but can also wield great power when it floods and overwhelms the land. In Chinese medicine, water is believed to govern the kidney, the urinary bladder and jing. It is associated with the ears, bones and governs the sea of marrow and therefore the brain. The negative emotions associated with water are fear and anxiety, and the positive emotions are fortitude and the virtue of wisdom; the "soul" associated with water is zhi (志), meaning "will" or "determination."

== Cycle of wuxing ==
- In the regenerative cycle of the wuxing, metal engenders water, as it traps falling water from a source, and water begets wood as "rain or dew makes plant life flourish".
- In the conquest cycle, water overcomes fire, as "nothing will put out a fire as quickly as water". Earth overcomes water as earth-built canals direct the flow, and soil absorbs water.
