= Metal (wuxing) =

Fourth of five elements of the Wuxing

In Chinese philosophy, metal or gold (Chinese: 金; pinyin: jīn) is one of the five concepts that form the wuxing. It is the returning or the declining stage, and is associated with the Western direction, dusk, autumn, loss, grief, the later years of life and the White Tiger. In Traditional Chinese Medicine, Metal is the young yin symbol of Yinyang philosophy, its motion is going inwards and its energy is contracting. It is related to the Zung solid organ the lungs, and the fu or hollow organ the large intestine. Its energy has governance over the respiratory system including the noses, and the skin. The archetypal metals are silver or gold denoting something of selfworth, special or valuable.

== Attributes ==
In Chinese Taoism and traditional Chinese medical theory and thought, some attributes of Metal are firmness, rigidity, focus, integrity, and quality. The metal person when excessive is controlling, cutoff and arrogant, set in their ways as metal can become very rigid, conversely when deficient can lack self-worth, aloof and easily brought to tears with grief. In balance the Metal constitution is self-reliant and resilient and able to handle their problems alone. They are also stable, intelligent, business-oriented, and because the nature of metal is to prioritise they are good at organization and recognising others talents. As the archetypical character of metal is that of a alchemist having strong impulses, generative powers that they use to change and transform situation and those who come into contact with them. The well-balanced metal person is calm, humble and always endeavours to be honest, considerate and a person with a clear, focused mind.

The traditional Organs associated with this element are the Zung organ the Iung (yin), and the Fu organ the Large intestine (yang), the taste spicy, the pungent smell as it is connected to the nose and respiratory system, and according to the Ziwu Liuzhu the opening time for the Lung is 3-5a.m. and the Large Intestine 5a.m.-7a.m.

== Astrology ==
In Chinese astrology, metal is included in the 10 heavenly stems (the five elements in their yin and yang forms), which combine with the 12 Earthly Branches (or Chinese signs of the zodiac), to form the 60-year cycle. Yang metal years end in 0 (e.g. 1980), while Yin years end in 1 (e.g. 1981). Metal governs the Chinese zodiac signs Monkey and Rooster. The planet Venus is associated with metal because it is white in color (the Chinese color of death), and can be seen in the west as the evening star.

== Cycle of Wu Xing ==
In the regenerative cycle of the Wu Xing, earth engenders Metal as "all metal has to be extracted from the earth in which it resides"; Metal begets water as from the mountain tops flowed the water from the source.

In the conquest cycle, fire overcomes metal as love melts the coldest heart or "can only be melted and forged" by flame or heat; Metal adds minerals to wood for it to grow healthy and straight or overcomes wood as the metal axe is able to topple the tallest tree.

However, the Cycle of Wu Xing also states that excessive volumes of wood or growth will end in depleting small volumes of metal

Wood by excessively wanting to grow can undermine its integrity and can not achieve optimal hight so becomes a weed and not a tree, as seen in the over farming of land.
