= Wood (wuxing) =

First of five elements of Wu Xing

In Chinese philosophy, wood (Chinese: 木; pinyin: mù), sometimes more accurately translated as tree, is one of the five concepts that conform the wuxing. It is the growing of the matter, or the matter's growing expanding stage. Wood is the young yang symbol of the Yinyang philosophy, it can be seen as the fuelling Fire. It stands for the season of spring, the eastern direction, the planet Jupiter, the color blue (qing), windy weather, and the Azure Dragon in Four Symbols.

== Attributes ==
In Chinese Taoist and Traditional Chinese medicine thought, Wood attributes are considered to be strong and flexibility, as within the nature bamboo. It is also associated with qualities of warmth, generosity, cooperation, and idealism. The Wood person will be expansive, a socialite as they are courageous and outgoing and charismatic, but when feeling confined, held back, or misunderstood by others, therefore can become easily frustrated and angry. The wood element is one that seeks ways to grow and expand. Wood heralds the beginning of life, dawn, springtime and buds, sensuality and fecundity. Wood needs moisture from Water its Mother or preceding phase element to thrive and flourish.

In Chinese medicine, wood can be associated with negative feelings of anger, hopelessness and positive feelings of optimism, courage, patience and the Virtue of benevolence (Ren 仁). The soul associated with wood is the Hun (魂).

Organs associated with this element are the Zung organ the liver (yin), and the Fu organ the gall bladder (yang), the taste sour, the rancid smell also the eyes and tendons, and according to the Ziwu Liuzhu the opening time for the Liver is 1-3a.m. and the Gallbladder 11pm-1a.m.

== Astrology ==
In Chinese astrology, wood is included in the 10 heavenly stems (the five elements in their yin and yang forms), which combine with the 12 earthly branches (or Chinese signs of the zodiac), to form a 60 year cycle.

- Yang wood year (e.g. 1974).
- Yin wood year (e.g. 1975).

Wood governs the Chinese zodiac signs Tiger and Rabbit.

== Cycle of Wu Xing ==
In the regenerative cycle of the Wu Xing, water engenders Wood, "as rain or dew makes plant life flourish"; Wood begets fire as "fire is generated by rubbing together two pieces of wood" and it must be fueled by burning wood. Since wood also represents wind, it also nourishes fire with the flow of oxygen.

In the conquest cycle:

Wood overcomes earth by binding it together with the roots of trees and drawing sustenance from the soil;

Metal overcomes Wood, as the metal axe can topple the largest trees. In the less figurative sense, the dryness and coldness of Metal causes wood, like the trees to lose their leaves by the sap going inwards and returning to the roots in Autumn or in the fall.
