= Earth (wuxing) =

Third of five elements in Wuxing cycle

In Chinese philosophy, earth or soil (Chinese: 土; pinyin: tǔ) is one of the five concepts that conform the wuxing. Earth is the Qi balance of both yin and yang in the Wuxing philosophy, as well as the changing or central point of physical matter or a subject. Its motion is centralising, and its energy is stabilizing and conserving.

Earth is associated with the colour yellow or ochre and the planet Saturn and it lies at the centre of the four directions of the compass in Chinese cosmology. It is associated with late summer and also the turning point of each of the four seasons, as Earth is prone to being over burdened or stuck. Its climate is that of dampness, which causes the body-mind to be clouded through a deficiency of yang qi. In traditional Chinese medicine, earth governs the yin, Zang organ the spleen, and the yang, Fu organ stomach, mouth and muscles. Its Primal Spirit is the Yi, and emotion of happiness and is represented by the Yellow Dragon or Qilin, color yellow and golden.

== Attributes ==
The Wu Xing Earth is associated with the qualities of patience, thoughtfulness, practicality, hard work, and stability. The earth element is also nurturing and seeks to draw all things together with itself, in order to bring balance and stability. Other attributes of the earth element include mindfulness, purpose, happiness, stubbornness, mediation and fidelity. Its Yin (deficiency) emotion is worry or pensiveness and in Yang (excess) its emotion is self-pity, self-sympathy, greed, gluttony and selfishness. When earth is in balance there is a feeling of peace, happiness and contentment. The soul associated with Earth is the Yi (意).

== Astrology ==
Earth plays an important role in Chinese astrology. In Chinese astrology earth is included in the 10 Heavenly Stems (the five elements in their yin and yang forms), which combine with the 12 Earthly Branches (or Chinese signs of the zodiac), to form the 60 year cycle. Yang earth years end in 8 (e.g. 1998), while Yin earth years end in 9 (e.g. 1999). Earth is the central balance of the elements and therefore lends qualities to all 12 animals as well.

The element earth is associated with the planet Saturn on account of its yellow color. However, some Western astrologers have suggested that the Western associations of Saturn give it greater affinity with the rigid, controlling Chinese element of Metal; while the Chinese conception of earth as a centering, harmonizing element has more in common with the Western notion of the planet Venus.

As I Ching and Feng Shui described, Earth is the center to which all movements tend to go to or come from, even if temporarily, that is to say, as with all of the elements or phases it can polarize with any of the other movements-elements: Fire, Water, Wood and Metal. These four types of Earth are Earth-of-Water (Wet/Cold Earth), Earth-of-Fire (Arid/Hot Earth), Earth-of-Metal (Dry/Hard Earth) and Earth-of-Wood (Loose-Fertile/Warm Earth).

Yellow, orange, beige and brown colors represent Earth.

Earth governs Ox, Dragon, Goat, and Dog.

== Cycle of Wu Xing ==
In the controlling cycle, earth controls water by damming or absorbing it; wood can overcome it by breaking it up (by the roots).

In the insulting cycle, earth overcomes wood by stagnating its growth or covering it up.

In the constructive cycle, earth is produced by fire's ashes, and then solidifies its minerals to produce metal.

In the consuming cycle, metal makes earth poor by sucking all its minerals, and dries its humidity.
