= The Drums discography =

Discography of American indie pop band The Drums

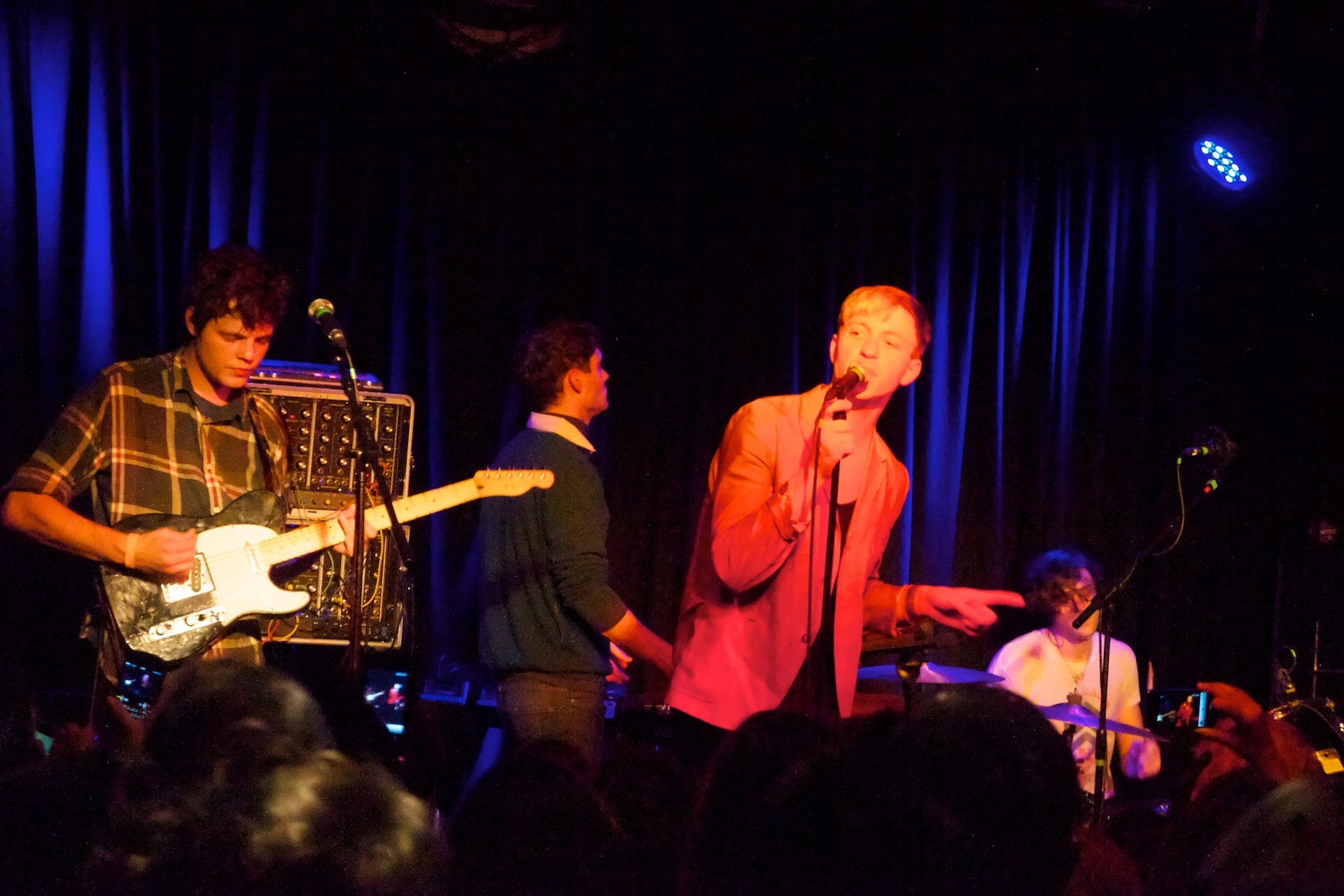
- The Drums performing at the Lexington in September 2011
- Studio albums: 6
- EPs: 2
- Compilation albums: 1
- Singles: 26
- Music videos: 14

The discography of American indie pop band The Drums consists of six studio albums, one compilation album, two extended plays, 29 singles, and 15 music videos.

== Albums ==
=== Studio albums ===
List of studio albums with selected chart positions and certifications
Title	Details	Peak chart positions										Certifications (sales thresholds)
Title	Details	US Heat.	AUS	BEL (FL)	BEL (WA)	FRA	GER	IRL	JPN	NOR	UK	Certifications (sales thresholds)
The Drums	Released: June 8, 2010; Label: Downtown, Moshi Moshi, Island; Format: LP, CD, download	17	52	44	88	100	56	29	34	30	16	BPI: Gold
Portamento	Released: September 6, 2011; Label: Frenchkiss, Moshi Moshi, Island; Format: LP, CD, download	10	61	96	59	183	93	59	56	—	44	
Encyclopedia	Released: September 23, 2014; Label: Minor; Format: LP, CD, download	10	—	—	—	—	—	—	131	—	135	
Abysmal Thoughts	Released: June 16, 2017; Label: ANTI-; Format: LP, CD, download	9	—	—	157	—	—	—	—	—	—	
Brutalism	Released: April 5, 2019; Label: ANTI-; Format: LP, CD, download	10	—	—	—	—	—	—	—	—	—	
Jonny	Released: October 13, 2023; Label: ANTI-; Formats: CD, LP, download	—	—	—	—	—	—	—	—	—	—	
"—" denotes releases that did not chart or were not released in that territory.

=== Compilation albums ===
List of compilation albums
Title	Details
Mommy Don't Spank Me	Released: April 2, 2021; Label: Universal; Format: download

== Extended plays ==
List of extended plays with selected chart positions
Title	Details	Peak chart positions
Title	Details	UK
Summertime!	Released: October 12, 2009; Label: Twentyseven, Moshi Moshi; Format: LP, CD, download	193
iTunes Festival: London 2010	Released: August 10, 2010; Label: Island; Format: download	—
"—" denotes releases that did not chart or were not released in that territory.

== Singles ==
List of singles, with selected chart positions and certifications, showing year released as single and album name
Title	Year	Peak chart positions									Certifications	Album
Title	Year	AUS Hit.	AUT	BEL (FL)	BEL (WA)	JPN	MEX	SCO	UK	UK Indie	Certifications	Album
"Let's Go Surfing" (Note: "Let's Go Surfing" was later added to The Drums) (Note: Only the track "Let's Go Surfing" received chart placement.)	2009	—	—	—	—	—	—	45	107	45	BPI: Silver	Summertime!
"I Felt Stupid" / "Down by the Water" (Note: "Down by the Water" was later added to The Drums)	2009	—	—	—	—	—	11	—	— (Note: "I Felt Stupid" / "Down by the Water" did not enter the UK Singles Chart, but peaked at number 49 on the UK Physical Singles Chart Top 100.)	—		Summertime!
"Best Friend"	2010	—	—	—	—	—	—	—	110	—		The Drums
"Forever and Ever, Amen"	2010	—	—	78	—	—	20	—	182	—		The Drums
"Let's Go Surfing" / "Don't Be a Jerk, Jonny"	2010	—	57	43	66	34	—	65	63	—		The Drums
"Me and the Moon"	2010	—	—	—	—	—	28	—	— (Note: "Me and the Moon" did not enter the UK Singles Chart, but peaked at number 69 on the UK Physical Singles Chart Top 100.)	—		The Drums
"The New World"	2011	—	—	—	—	—	—	—	—	—		Non-album single
"Money"	2011	15	—	—	—	—	26	—	— (Note: "Money" did not enter the UK Singles Chart, but peaked at number 15 on the UK Physical Singles Chart.)	—	RIAA: Platinum; BPI: Silver	Portamento
"How It Ended"	2011	—	—	118	94	—	28	—	—	—		Portamento
"Days"	2012	—	—	125	—	—	32	—	—	—		Portamento
"Magic Mountain"	2014	—	—	—	—	—	50	—	— (Note: "Magic Mountain" did not enter the UK Singles Chart, but peaked at number 42 on the UK Physical Singles Chart.)	—		Encyclopedia
"I Can't Pretend"	2014	—	—	—	—	—	37	—	— (Note: "I Can't Pretend" did not enter the UK Singles Chart, but peaked at number 77 on the UK Physical Singles Chart.)	—		Encyclopedia
"Blood Under My Belt"	2017	—	—	—	—	—	—	—	—	—		Abysmal Thoughts
"Heart Basel"	2017	—	—	—	—	—	—	—	—	—		Abysmal Thoughts
"Head of the Horse"	2017	—	—	—	—	—	—	—	—	—		Abysmal Thoughts
"Mirror"	2017	—	—	—	—	—	—	—	—	—		Abysmal Thoughts
"Meet Me in Mexico"	2018	—	—	—	—	—	—	—	—	—		Non-album single
"Body Chemistry"	2019	—	—	—	—	—	—	—	—	—		Brutalism
"626 Bedford Avenue"	2019	—	—	—	—	—	—	—	—	—		Brutalism
"Loner"	2019	—	—	—	—	—	—	—	—	—		Brutalism
"Try"	2019	—	—	—	—	—	—	—	—	—		Brutalism
"I Want It All"	2023	—	—	—	—	—	—	—	—	—		Jonny
"Plastic Envelope / Protect Him Always"	2023	—	—	—	—	—	—	—	—	—		Jonny
"Obvious"	2023	—	—	—	—	—	—	—	—	—		Jonny
"Better"	2023	—	—	—	—	—	—	—	—	—		Jonny
"Isolette"	2023	—	—	—	—	—	—	—	—	—		Jonny
"The Flowers"	2023	—	—	—	—	—	—	—	—	—		Jonny
"The Impossible"	2024	—	—	—	—	—	—	—	—	—		Jonny (Deluxe)
"It Didn't Matter" (with Mareux)	2026	—	—	—	—	—	—	—	—	—		TBA
"Yes&No" (with ledbyher)	2026	—	—	—	—	—	—	—	—	—		TBA
"Isolation" (with 60 Juno)	2026	—	—	—	—	—	—	—	—	—		TBA
"Black Star" (with Genesis Owusu)	2026	—	—	—	—	—	—	—	—	—		TBA
"Eyelashes" (with Pearly Drops)	2026	—	—	—	—	—	—	—	—	—		TBA
"—" denotes a recording that did not chart or was not released in that territory.

== Other songs ==
=== Guest appearances ===
List of appearances, showing year released and album name
Single	Year	Album
"In Your Eyes" (Edwyn Collins featuring The Drums)	2011	Losing Sleep
"Forget" (Kyle (musician) featuring The Drums, Trippie Redd & iann dior)	2020	See You When I Am Famous
"DINNER TIME" (Eyedress featuring The Drums & Paul Cherry)	2020	Full Time Lover
"TRY ANOTHER TIME" (Eyedress featuring The Drums)	2020	Full Time Lover
"Ch-Ch-Change" (Yo Gabba Gabba! With The Drums)	2024	Yo Gabba Gabbaland (Season 1) Soundtrack

== Music videos ==
Year	Month	Title	Director
2009	August	"Let's Go Surfing"	David Fishel
2010	January	"I Felt Stupid"	Chris Moukarbel and Valerie Veatch
2010	March	"Best Friend"	The Drums
2010	May	"Forever and Ever, Amen"	Surround and The Drums
2010	August	"Down by the Water"	Surround and The Drums
2010	October	"Me and the Moon"	Surround and The Drums
2011	July	"Money"	M. Blash
2011	October	"How It Ended"	Patrick Roberts
2012	February	"Days"	Patrick Roberts
2014	July	"Magic Mountain"	The Drums
2014	October	"I Can't Pretend"	BRTHR
2015	August	"There Is Nothing Left"	David Gantz and Theo Cohn
2017	April	"Blood Under My Belt"	CYCY Sanders
2019	April	"Body Chemistry"	Anton Reva
2023	October	"Dying"	Kevin Lombardo
