= Money (The Drums song) =

2011 single by the Drums

Single by the Drums

from the album Portamento
- Released: August 19, 2011
- Recorded: 2011
- Genre: Alternative rock; indie rock
- Length: 3:53
- Label: Island
- Songwriters: Connor Hanwick; Jonathan Pierce
- Producers: Connor Hanwick; Jonathan Pierce

The Drums singles chronology
"The New World" (2011)	"Money" (2011)	"How It Ended" (2011)

Music video
- "Money" on YouTube

"Money" is a song by American indie pop band the Drums, as the lead single from their second studio album, Portamento (2011). It was written and produced by frontman and vocalist Jonathan Pierce, and guitarist Connor Hanwick. The song was first released on August 19, 2011. A bonus track titled "Blue Stripes" was included with the single on iTunes. It was their second single as a trio following the departure of Adam Kessler in September 2010. The song is an alternative and indie rock song with lyrics about a protagonist who is poor.

"Money" received positive reviews from music critics and it entered charts in Mexico at number 26 on the Ingles Airplay chart, in Australia at number 15 on the Hitseekers Singles chart, and the UK at number 15 on the Physical Singles chart. M. Blash directed the song's music video which was uploaded to YouTube. The song gained popularity in 2023 due to its usage as a soundtrack for a TikTok "album cover challenge" trend.

== Background and lyrics ==
It's just about being a fuck-up and not really learning from mistakes, but wanting to have a good heart, wanting to do better, and just kind of letting your whole life never getting to that point. Nothing rubs me the wrong way more than people who seem to have it all together.

— Jonathan Pierce

The song was the Drums' second single as a trio following the departure of guitarist Adam Kessler in September 2010 and the release of "The New World" on April 11, 2011, a single with proceeds that went to disaster relief efforts in Japan. It was written and produced by frontman and vocalist Jonathan Pierce, and guitarist Connor Hanwick.

"Money"
Rolling Stone stated that "Money" seemed to deal with coming to terms with a lack of financial success, as mentioned in the chorus (sampled).

Portamento was recorded in Pierce's apartment, as well as studios in New York City and Woodstock. The album was created over the span of six months with every song recorded in one day. According to Pierce the band was "very close" to splitting up during the recording of the album due to arguments but that it has "nourished" the album.

Musically, "Money" is an alternative and indie rock song. Pierce said that the song is essentially about "trying and failing, but with a heart that is mostly sincere". He added that "reality hit really hard after the hype of the first album and the first EP started settling down" and that the listener "realize[s] what everything actually, really is". Rolling Stone stated that the song seemed to primarily deal with coming to terms with a lack of financial success with the lyric "I want to buy you something, but I don't have any money".

== Release and promotion ==
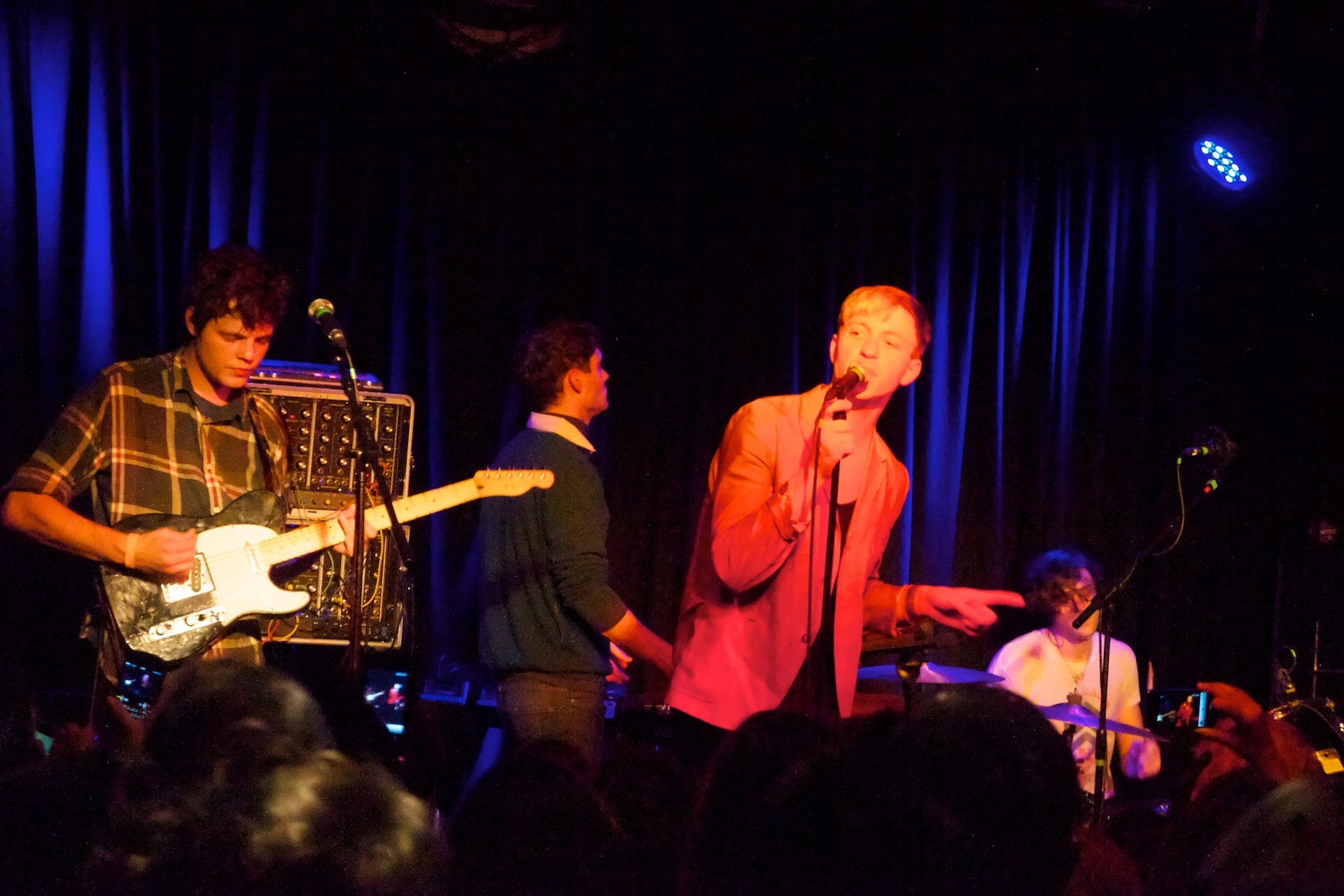
The Drums performing at the Lexington in September 2011

The song premiered on BBC Radio 1 in July 2011. On August 19, 2011, the song was released for digital download on iTunes in which a bonus track titled "Blue Stripes" was included. In September 2011, the song was included as the lead single from the Drums' second studio album Portamento. Remixes of the song were released by American indie rock band Craft Spells, Seattle based electronic duo Beat Connection and English electronic singer Chad Valley respectively. The latter two remixes and their bonus track "Blue Stripes" were included on the Drums' compilation album Mommy Don't Spank Me released in April 2021.

In May 2011, it was announced that for their live shows that year they would become a five-piece with Myles Matheny replacing Adam Kessler as guitarist, Chris Stein replacing Jacob Graham on drums and Graham focusing on synthesizers. In August 2011, the Drums performed the song at Lollapalooza in Chicago for Rolling Stone. In September 2011, they performed the song in London at the Hoxton Bar and Kitchen, the Lexington, and XOYO as well as at Bestival on the Isle of Wight and SPLIT Festival in Sunderland.

== Reception ==
Priya Elan of NME gave the song four out of five stars, saying it was "ditty [and] just as appealingly bittersweet" as the songs "Book of Stories" and "Best Friend" from the Drum's debut album in 2010. Elan added that the song featured "ping pong guitar lines that bounce around with the kinetic chaos of rubber balls hurled in a box". Larry Fitzmaurice of Pitchfork said that the song's subject of "being broke (and feeling inadequate because of that) is something we can all relate to". Lauren Sloss of Indie Shuffle likened the song to English rock band The Smiths and its frontman Morrissey saying it had "Morrissey-esque vocals" but said it was a "bit too fast-paced" and a "bit too peppy" to be a simple emulation of the band. The Chad Valley remix of the song was described by Purple Sneakers as "huge, swirling but still punchy enough to play in a club environment". Hawley Dunbar of Sidewalk Hustle said that the Craft Spells remix was a "slower chilled version reminiscent at times of early Groove Armada".

The song peaked at number 15 on the UK Physical Singles Chart and number 26 on Billboard's Mexico Ingles Airplay. The song was heavily sampled in the 2020 single "Backstage Pass" by rapper Smino and music producer Monte Booker, which was included on the soundtrack for American football video game Madden NFL 21. The song saw a resurgence in popularity in 2023 due to its usage in the "album cover challenge" on TikTok, whereby people turn unusual photographs into album covers. The TikTok filter consists of five photos and the caption "proof that not everything can be an album cover". As of February 2023, the filter has over 651,000 videos attached and the hashtag "albumcoverchallenge" has over 840 million views. The song surprassed 230 million streams on Spotify and was certified gold by the RIAA in the United States on February 22, 2023, over a decade after its initial release. The song was certified silver by the BPI in the United Kingdom on 19 July 2024 and platinum by the RIAA on September 18, 2024.

== Music video ==
The music video for "Money" was uploaded to YouTube on July 25, 2011. It was directed by M. Blash who Pierce stated he had met in 2010 at Gus Van Sant's house in Los Angeles. At the time, the Drums were directing all their own videos, but with the new album they wanted to bring in "talented people who really get what [the] band is about". The video features rehearsals of the band intercut with footage of them walking in their home city of New York in locations such as Chinatown and the West Side Highway. The shots include Pierce spying on two women having a conversation in a garden and the band approaching a park with people pointing their guns to the sky in accordance with the line "If I had a gun, I would trade in my gun".

== Track listing ==
Digital download

- "Money" – 3:53
- "Blue Stripes" – 4:07

== Charts ==
Weekly chart performance for "Money"
Chart (2011)	Peak position
Australia Hitseekers Singles (ARIA)	15
Mexico Ingles Airplay (Billboard)	26
UK Physical Singles (OCC)	15

== Certifications ==
Region	Certification	Certified units/sales
United Kingdom (BPI)	Silver	200,000^{‡}
United States (RIAA)	Platinum	1,000,000^{‡}
^{‡} Sales+streaming figures based on certification alone.
