= Wild Geese =

Wild Geese may refer to:

== Animals ==
- Geese
  - Greylag geese, specifically

== Literature ==
- The Wild Geese, a 1908 novel by Stanley J. Weyman
- The Wild Geese (Mori novel), a 1911 Japanese novel by Ōgai Mori
- Wild Geese (novel), a 1925 Canadian novel by Martha Ostenso
- The Wild Geese (Carney novel), a 1978 novel by Daniel Carney
- The Temple of the Wild Geese, a 1961 Japanese novella by Tsutomu Mizukami
- The Wild Geese, a 1981 novel by Eilis Dillon
- Wild Geese, a 1986 poem by Mary Oliver
- Wild Geese, a 2010 novel by Caroline Pignat
- Wild Geese: A Collection of Nan Shepherd's Writing, a 2019 book by Nan Shepherd
- Wild Geese, a 2023 novel by Soula Emmanuel

== Film and videos ==
- Wild Geese (film), a 1927 silent film based on the novel by Ostenso
- The Wild Geese (1953 film), a Japanese film based on the novel by Mori Ogai
- The Temple of Wild Geese, a 1962 Japanese film directed by Yūzō Kawashima
- The Wild Geese, a 1978 British mercenary war film based on Carney's novel
  - Wild Geese II, a 1985 sequel to the above
- Code Name: Wild Geese, a 1984 Italian mercenary war film
- Wild Geese (video ballad), a 2006 English video ballad

== Sports ==
- Wild Geese GAA, an Irish Gaelic Athletic Association club
- London Irish Wild Geese, a nickname of the London Irish Amateur rugby team
- Wild Geese GFC, an Irish GAA club formed in Southern California

== Other ==
- Wild Geese (soldiers), Irish soldiers who served in European armies after being exiled from Ireland
- "Wild Geese" (song), a 1917 war poem by Walter Flex, set to music by Robert Götz
- "Wild Geese", a song by the Drums from Encyclopedia, 2014
- Wild Geese, a rabbit in the Japanese manga Is the Order a Rabbit?
- "With the Wild Geese", symphonic poem (1910) by Hamilton Harty

== See also ==
- Wild Goose (disambiguation)
