= Chinese zodiac =

Lunar calendar classification in a 12-year cycle

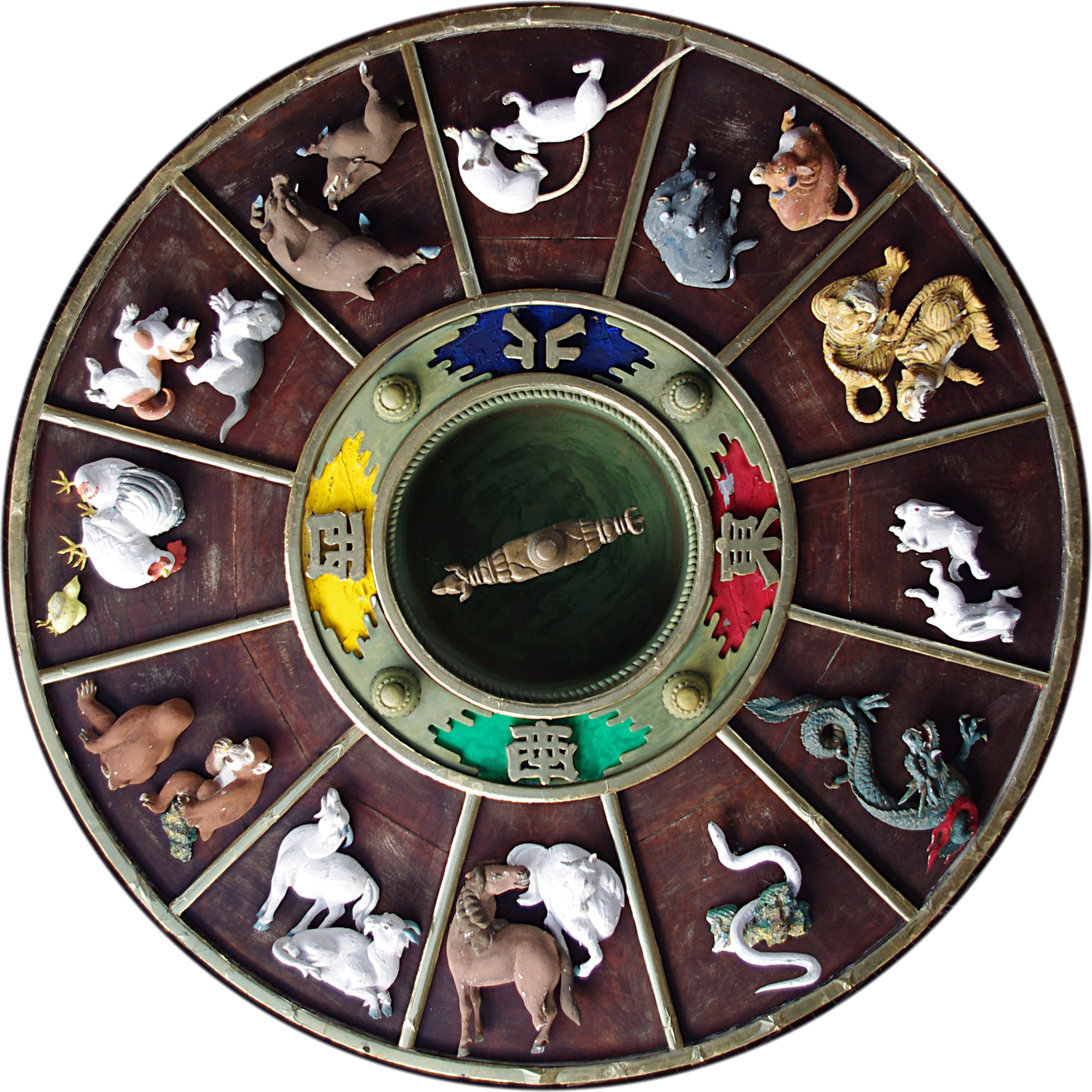
- Chinese: 生肖
- Hanyu Pinyin: shēngxiào
Transcriptions
Standard Mandarin
- Hanyu Pinyin: shēngxiào
- Bopomofo: ㄕㄥ ㄒㄧㄠˋ
- Gwoyeu Romatzyh: shengshiaw
- Wade–Giles: sheng^{1}-hsiao^{4}
- IPA: [ʂə́ŋ.ɕjâʊ]
Wu
- Romanization: sen平-siau去
Hakka
- Romanization: sensiau
Yue: Cantonese
- Yale Romanization: sāangchiu
- Jyutping: saang1 ciu3
- IPA: [saŋ˥.tsʰiw˧]
Southern Min
- Hokkien POJ: singsiàu
Eastern Min
- Fuzhou BUC: săng-ngá

Alternative Chinese name
- Simplified Chinese: 属相
- Traditional Chinese: 屬相
- Hanyu Pinyin: shǔxiàng
Transcriptions
Standard Mandarin
- Hanyu Pinyin: shǔxiàng
- Bopomofo: ㄕㄨˇ ㄒㄧㄤˋ
- Gwoyeu Romatzyh: shuushianq
- Wade–Giles: shu^{3}-hsiang^{4}
- IPA: [ʂù.ɕjâŋ]
Wu
- Romanization: zoh入-sian平
Yue: Cantonese
- Yale Romanization: suhkseung
- Jyutping: suk6 soeng3
- IPA: [sʊk̚˨.sœŋ˧]
Southern Min
- Hokkien POJ: sio̍ksiùnn

The Chinese zodiac is a traditional classification scheme based on the Chinese calendar that assigns an animal and its reputed attributes to each year in a repeating twelve-year (or duodenary) cycle. The zodiac is very important in Chinese culture as a reflection of traditional Chinese philosophy. Chinese folkways held that one's personality is related to the attributes of their zodiac animal. Originating from China, the zodiac and its variations remain popular in many East Asian, Central Asian and Southeast Asian countries, such as Japan, South Korea, Vietnam, Malaysia, Kazakhstan, Kyrgyzstan, Mongolia, Turkey, and Singapore, and among immigrants from these countries.

Identifying this scheme as a "zodiac" reflects superficial similarities to the Western zodiac: both divide time cycles into twelve parts, label the majority of those parts with animals, and are used to ascribe a person's personality or events in their life to the person's particular relationship to the cycle. The 12 Chinese zodiac animals in the cycle are not only used to represent years in China but are also believed to influence people's personalities, careers, compatibility, marriages, and fortunes.

For the starting date of a zodiac year, there are two schools of thought in Chinese astrology: Chinese New Year or the start of spring.

== History ==
Some scholars suggest the twelve animals were chosen for their symbolic traits, based on their revered status in traditional Chinese culture. The choice varied regionally before being standardized in the Han Dynasty, when the Chinese zodiac, as an essential part of Chinese culture, started to take shape. This era formalizes a twelve-year cycle, where each year is associated with a specific animal, as part of a timekeeping system. This system, known as the zodiac cycle, combined the twelve Earthly Branches (地支) with the ten Heavenly Stems (天干) to create a 60-year cycle, a cyclical timekeeping system seen as embodying both personality traits and the broader society. Each Earthly Branch was linked to one of the twelve zodiac signs and to an animal: Rat, Ox, Tiger, Rabbit, Dragon, Snake, Horse, Goat, Monkey, Rooster, Dog, and Pig.

According to legend, the Jade Emperor held a contest to decide which animals would be lucky enough to be included in the calendar. The winner of the race – the rat – received the first year of the 12-year cycle, and so on.

However, historical research suggests that the Chinese zodiac emerged after the establishment of the "Ganzhi or Sexagenary cycle", with each of the twelve animals directly assigned to one of the twelve Earthly Branches. In this system, a person's birth year determines their associated animal, which is linked to a specific Earthly Branch and serves both a chronological function and a means of categorizing individuals into symbolic groups, akin to a genus.

In the Eastern Han dynasty, Xu Shen said that the character si (巳) was the image of a snake, and the same was true for hai (亥) and shi (豕; 'pig'). Since the twelve Earthly Branches of the zodiac were easily confused, people replaced them with animals and borrowed the ordinal symbols to match them with the Earthly Branches to form a chronological symbol system.

In "Totem and celestial combination theory", it is suggested that the zodiac is ancient animal totem worship combined with astronomical images in astronomy.

== Signs ==
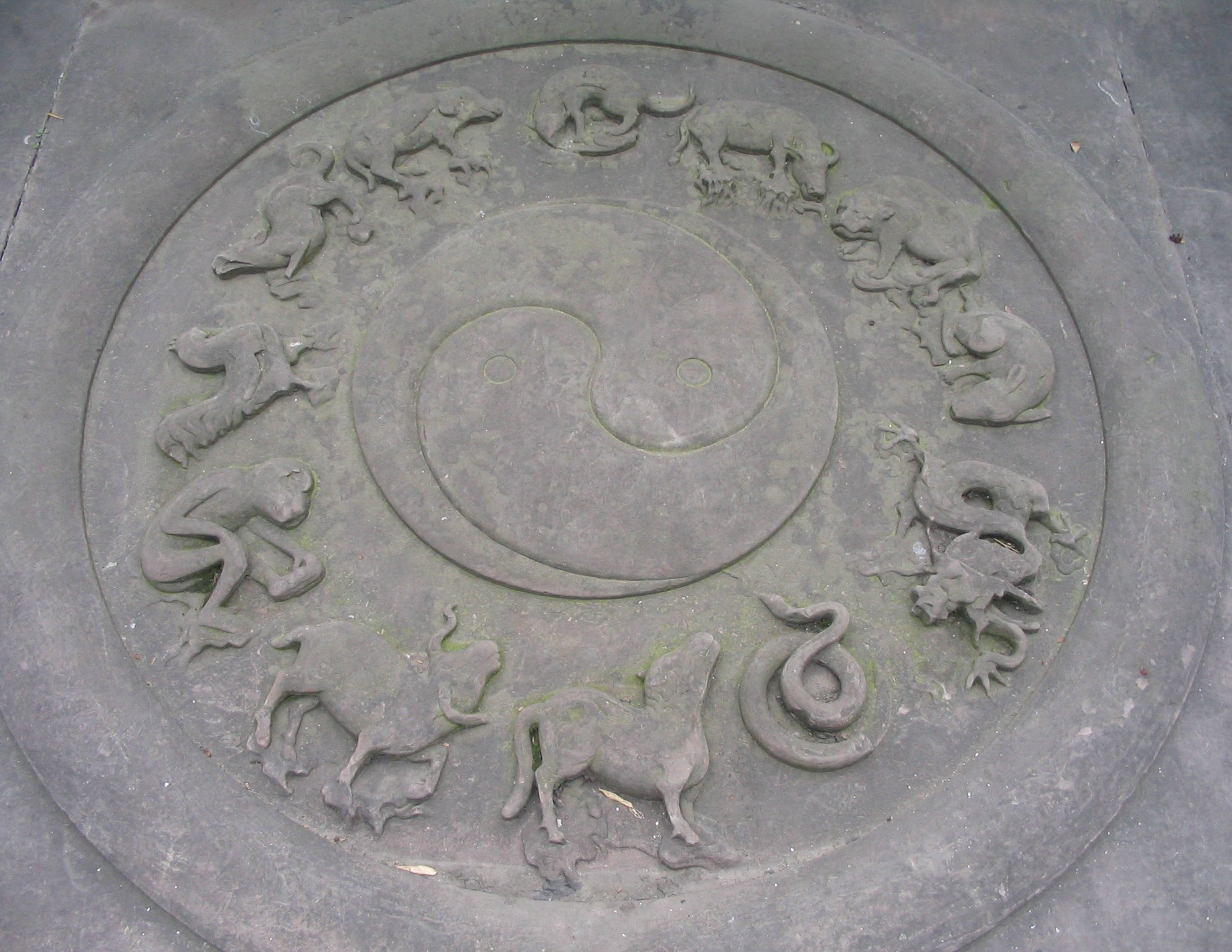
A stone carving of the Chinese zodiac

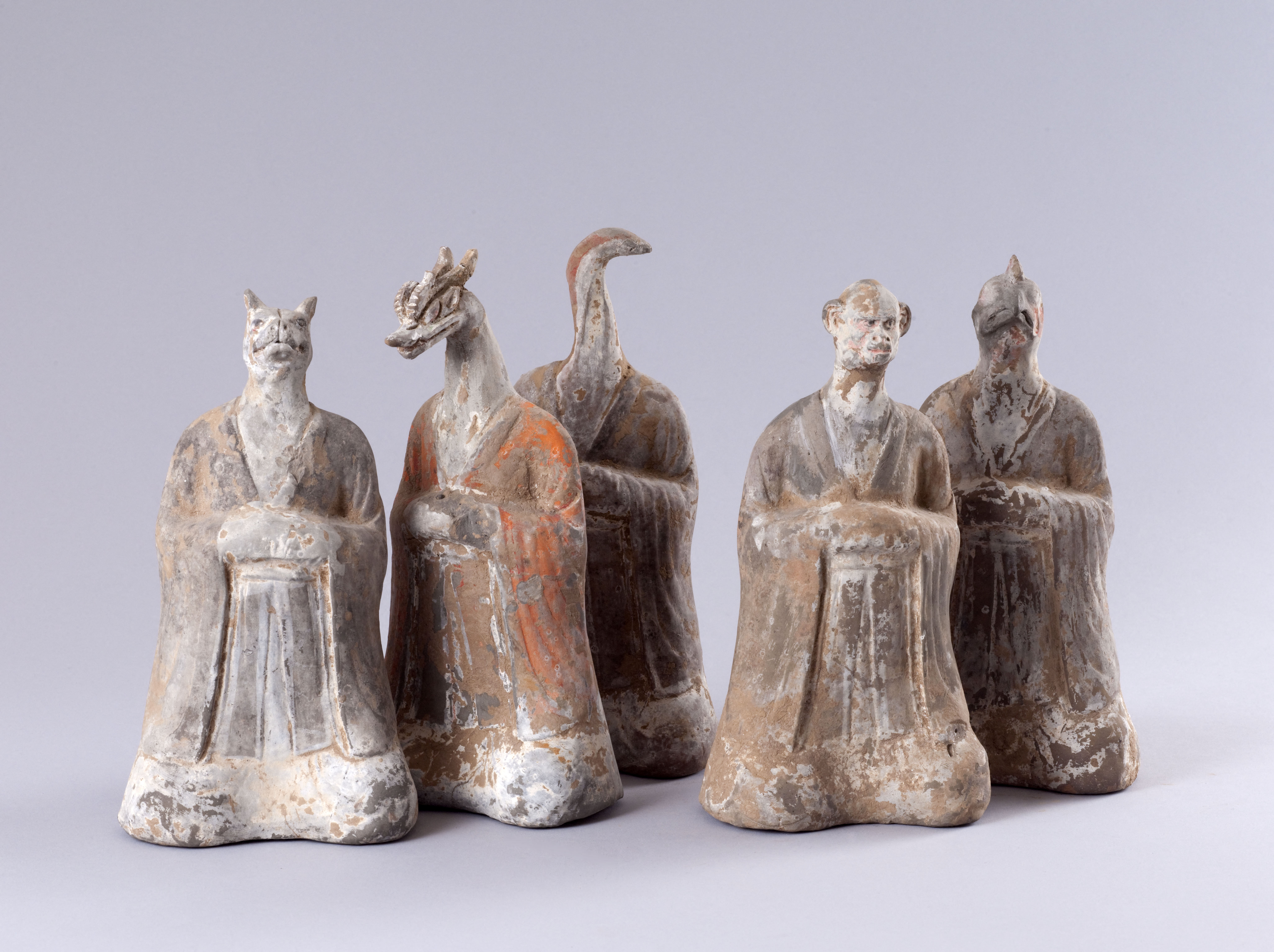
Tang dynasty era ceramic figurines of calendar animals, from left to right: Tiger-headed, Dragon-headed, Snake-headed, Monkey-headed and Rooster-headed. Musée Cernuschi

The zodiac traditionally begins with the sign of the Rat. The following are the twelve zodiac signs in order, each with its associated characteristics (Heavenly Stems, Earthly Branch, yin/yang force, Trine, and nature element). The belief that everyone and every animal has a role to play in society conforms to Confucian beliefs in a hierarchical society. Just as Confucian beliefs persist in parts of East and Southeast Asia today alongside more modern social views, so does zodiac use.

Number	English	Animal	Earthly branch	Yin/yang	Trine	Fixed element
1	Rat	鼠 shǔ	子 zǐ	Yang	1st	Water
2	Ox	牛 niú	丑 chǒu	Yin	2nd	Earth
3	Tiger	虎 hǔ	寅 yín	Yang	3rd	Wood
4	Rabbit	兔 tù	卯 mǎo	Yin	4th	Wood
5	Dragon	龍/龙 lóng	辰 chén	Yang	1st	Earth
6	Snake	蛇 shé	巳 sì	Yin	2nd	Fire
7	Horse	馬/马 mǎ	午 wǔ	Yang	3rd	Fire
8	Goat	羊 yáng	未 wèi	Yin	4th	Earth
9	Monkey	猴 hóu	申 shēn	Yang	1st	Metal
10	Rooster	雞/鸡 jī	酉 yǒu	Yin	2nd	Metal
11	Dog	狗 gǒu	戌 xū	Yang	3rd	Earth
12	Pig	豬/猪 zhū	亥 hài	Yin	4th	Water

In Chinese astrology the animal signs assigned by year represent self-presentation or perception by others. It is a common misconception that the animals assigned by year are the only signs, and many Western descriptions of Chinese astrology only reference this system. There are also animal signs assigned by month (called "inner animals"), by day (called "true animals"), and hours (called "secret animals"). The Earth is all twelve signs, with five seasons.

Michel Ferlus (2013) notes that the Old Chinese names of the earthly branches are of Austroasiatic origin. Some of Ferlus's comparisons are given below, with Old Chinese reconstructions cited from Baxter & Sagart (2014).

- 丑: Old Chinese *[n̥]ruʔ (compare Proto-Viet-Muong *c.luː 'water buffalo')
- 午: Old Chinese *[m].qʰˤaʔ (compare Proto-Viet-Muong *m.ŋəːˀ)
- 亥: Old Chinese *[g]ˤəʔ (compare Northern Proto-Viet-Muong *kuːrˀ)

There is also a lexical correspondence with Austronesian:

- 未: Old Chinese *m[ə]t-s (compare Atayal miːts)

The terms for the earthly branches are attested from Shang dynasty inscriptions and were likely also used before Shang times. Ferlus (2013) suggests that the terms were ancient pre-Shang borrowings from Austroasiatic languages spoken in the Yangtze River region.

== Chinese calendar ==
=== Years ===
Within the Four Pillars, the year is the pillar representing information about the person's family background and society or relationship with their grandparents. The person's age can also be easily deduced from their sign, the current sign of the year, and the person's generational disposition (teens, mid-20s, and so on). For example, a person born a Tiger is 12, 24, 36, (etc.) years old in the year of the Tiger (2022); in the year of the Rabbit (2023), that person is one year older.

The following table shows the 60-year cycle matched up to the Gregorian calendar for 1924–2043. The sexagenary cycle begins at lichun about February 4 according to some astrological sources.

	Year	Year	Associated animal	Yin/yang	Associated element	Heavenly stem	Earthly branch
	1924–1983	1984–2043	Associated animal	Yin/yang	Associated element	Heavenly stem	Earthly branch
1	1924/02/05 - 1925/01/23	1984/02/02 - 1985/02/19	Rat	Yang	Wood	甲	子
2	1925/01/24 - 1926/02/12	1985/02/20 - 1986/02/08	Ox	Yin	Wood	乙	丑
3	1926/02/13 - 1927/02/01	1986/02/09 - 1987/01/28	Tiger	Yang	Fire	丙	寅
4	1927/02/02 - 1928/01/22	1987/01/29 - 1988/02/16	Rabbit	Yin	Fire	丁	卯
5	1928/01/23 - 1929/02/09	1988/02/17 - 1989/02/05	Dragon	Yang	Earth	戊	辰
6	1929/02/10 - 1930/01/29	1989/02/06 - 1990/01/26	Snake	Yin	Earth	己	巳
7	1930/01/30 - 1931/02/16	1990/01/27 - 1991/02/14	Horse	Yang	Metal	庚	午
8	1931/02/17 - 1932/02/05	1991/02/15 - 1992/02/03	Goat	Yin	Metal	辛	未
9	1932/02/06 - 1933/01/25	1992/02/04 - 1993/01/22	Monkey	Yang	Water	壬	申
10	1933/01/26 - 1934/02/13	1993/01/23 - 1994/02/09	Rooster	Yin	Water	癸	酉
11	1934/02/14 - 1935/02/03	1994/02/10 - 1995/01/30	Dog	Yang	Wood	甲	戌
12	1935/02/04 - 1936/01/23	1995/01/31 - 1996/02/18	Pig	Yin	Wood	乙	亥
13	1936/01/24 - 1937/02/10	1996/02/19 - 1997/02/06	Rat	Yang	Fire	丙	子
14	1937/02/11 - 1938/01/30	1997/02/07 - 1998/01/27	Ox	Yin	Fire	丁	丑
15	1938/01/31 - 1939/02/18	1998/01/28 - 1999/02/15	Tiger	Yang	Earth	戊	寅
16	1939/02/19 - 1940/02/07	1999/02/16 - 2000/02/04	Rabbit	Yin	Earth	己	卯
17	1940/02/08 - 1941/01/26	2000/02/05 - 2001/01/23	Dragon	Yang	Metal	庚	辰
18	1941/01/27 - 1942/02/14	2001/01/24 - 2002/02/11	Snake	Yin	Metal	辛	巳
19	1942/02/15 - 1943/02/04	2002/02/12 - 2003/01/31	Horse	Yang	Water	壬	午
20	1943/02/05 - 1944/01/24	2003/02/01 - 2004/01/21	Goat	Yin	Water	癸	未
21	1944/01/25 - 1945/02/12	2004/01/22 - 2005/02/08	Monkey	Yang	Wood	甲	申
22	1945/02/13 - 1946/02/01	2005/02/09 - 2006/01/28	Rooster	Yin	Wood	乙	酉
23	1946/02/02 - 1947/01/21	2006/01/29 - 2007/02/17	Dog	Yang	Fire	丙	戌
24	1947/01/22 - 1948/02/09	2007/02/18 - 2008/02/06	Pig	Yin	Fire	丁	亥
25	1948/02/10 - 1949/01/28	2008/02/07 - 2009/01/25	Rat	Yang	Earth	戊	子
26	1949/01/29 - 1950/02/16	2009/01/26 - 2010/02/13	Ox	Yin	Earth	己	丑
27	1950/02/17 - 1951/02/05	2010/02/14 - 2011/02/02	Tiger	Yang	Metal	庚	寅
28	1951/02/06 - 1952/01/26	2011/02/03 - 2012/01/22	Rabbit	Yin	Metal	辛	卯
29	1952/01/27 - 1953/02/13	2012/01/23 - 2013/02/09	Dragon	Yang	Water	壬	辰
30	1953/02/14 - 1954/02/02	2013/02/10 - 2014/01/30	Snake	Yin	Water	癸	巳
31	1954/02/03 - 1955/01/23	2014/01/31 - 2015/02/18	Horse	Yang	Wood	甲	午
32	1955/01/24 - 1956/02/11	2015/02/19 - 2016/02/07	Goat	Yin	Wood	乙	未
33	1956/02/12 - 1957/01/30	2016/02/08 - 2017/01/27	Monkey	Yang	Fire	丙	申
34	1957/01/31 - 1958/02/17	2017/01/28 - 2018/02/15	Rooster	Yin	Fire	丁	酉
35	1958/02/18 - 1959/02/07	2018/02/16 - 2019/02/04	Dog	Yang	Earth	戊	戌
36	1959/02/08 - 1960/01/27	2019/02/05 - 2020/01/24	Pig	Yin	Earth	己	亥
37	1960/01/28 - 1961/02/14	2020/01/25 - 2021/02/11	Rat	Yang	Metal	庚	子
38	1961/02/15 - 1962/02/04	2021/02/12 - 2022/01/31	Ox	Yin	Metal	辛	丑
39	1962/02/05 - 1963/01/24	2022/02/01 - 2023/01/21	Tiger	Yang	Water	壬	寅
40	1963/01/25 - 1964/02/12	2023/01/22 - 2024/02/09	Rabbit	Yin	Water	癸	卯
41	1964/02/13 - 1965/02/01	2024/02/10 - 2025/01/28	Dragon	Yang	Wood	甲	辰
42	1965/02/02 - 1966/01/20	2025/01/29 - 2026/02/16	Snake	Yin	Wood	乙	巳
43	1966/01/21 - 1967/02/08	2026/02/17 - 2027/02/05	Horse	Yang	Fire	丙	午
44	1967/02/09 - 1968/01/29	2027/02/06 - 2028/01/25	Goat	Yin	Fire	丁	未
45	1968/01/30 - 1969/02/16	2028/01/26 - 2029/02/12	Monkey	Yang	Earth	戊	申
46	1969/02/17 - 1970/02/05	2029/02/13 - 2030/02/02	Rooster	Yin	Earth	己	酉
47	1970/02/06 - 1971/01/26	2030/02/03 - 2031/01/22	Dog	Yang	Metal	庚	戌
48	1971/01/27 - 1972/02/14	2031/01/23 - 2032/02/10	Pig	Yin	Metal	辛	亥
49	1972/02/15 - 1973/02/02	2032/02/11 - 2033/01/30	Rat	Yang	Water	壬	子
50	1973/02/03 - 1974/01/22	2033/01/31 - 2034/02/18	Ox	Yin	Water	癸	丑
51	1974/01/23 - 1975/02/10	2034/02/19 - 2035/02/07	Tiger	Yang	Wood	甲	寅
52	1975/02/11 - 1976/01/30	2035/02/08 - 2036/01/27	Rabbit	Yin	Wood	乙	卯
53	1976/01/31 - 1977/02/17	2036/01/28 - 2037/02/14	Dragon	Yang	Fire	丙	辰
54	1977/02/18 - 1978/02/06	2037/02/15 - 2038/02/03	Snake	Yin	Fire	丁	巳
55	1978/02/07 - 1979/01/27	2038/02/04 - 2039/01/23	Horse	Yang	Earth	戊	午
56	1979/01/28 - 1980/02/15	2039/01/24 - 2040/02/11	Goat	Yin	Earth	己	未
57	1980/02/16 - 1981/02/04	2040/02/12 - 2041/01/31	Monkey	Yang	Metal	庚	申
58	1981/02/05 - 1982/01/24	2041/02/01 - 2042/01/21	Rooster	Yin	Metal	辛	酉
59	1982/01/25 - 1983/02/12	2042/01/22 - 2043/02/09	Dog	Yang	Water	壬	戌
60	1983/02/13 - 1984/02/01	2043/02/10 - 2044/01/29	Pig	Yin	Water	癸	亥

== Compatibility ==
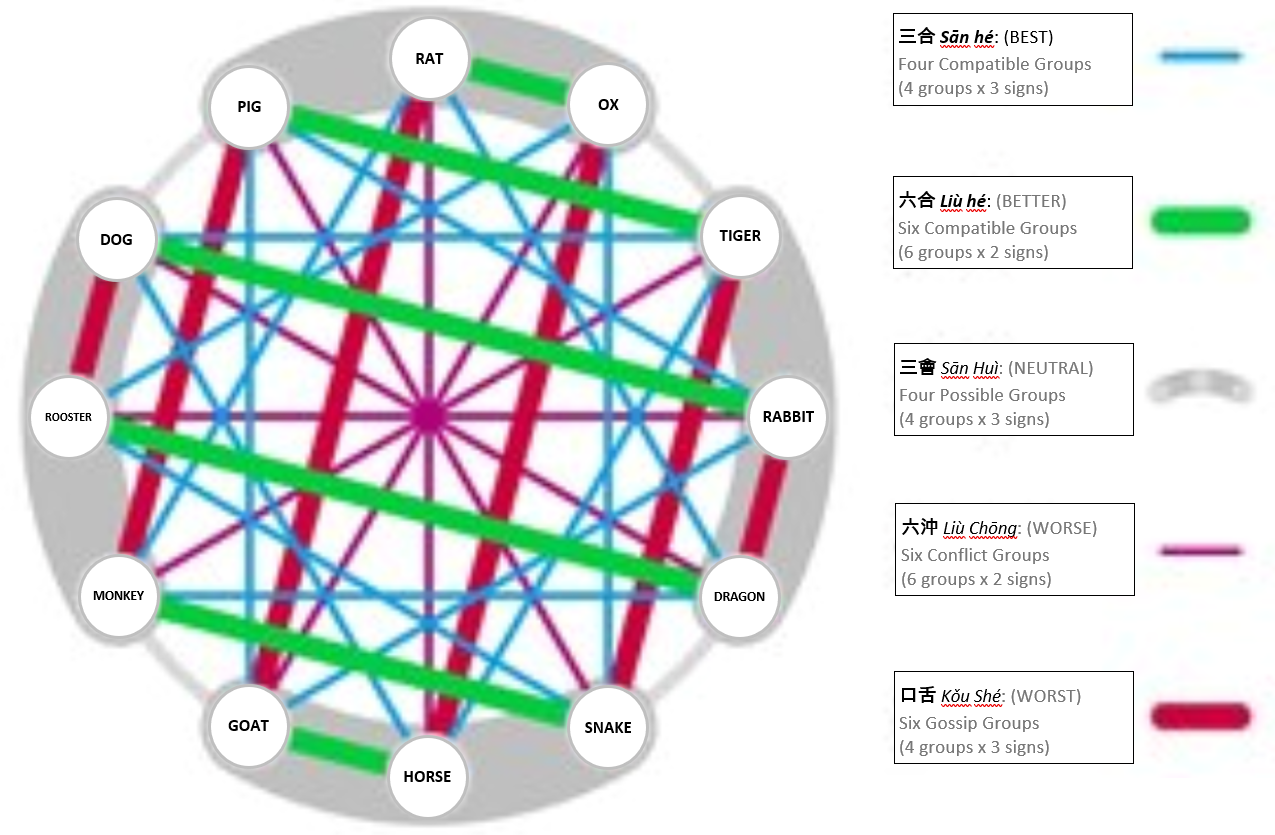
Chinese Zodiac Compatibility-Conflict-Harm Grid in accordance to one's nature, characteristics, and elements

As the Chinese zodiac is derived according to the ancient Five Elements Theory, every Chinese sign is associated with five elements with relations, among those elements, of interpolation, interaction, over-action, and counter-action—believed to be the common law of motions and changes of creatures in the universe. Different people born under each animal sign supposedly have different personalities, and practitioners of Chinese astrology consult such traditional details and compatibilities to offer putative guidance in life or for love and marriage. A common way to explore zodiac compatibility is with a chart showing how each zodiac sign interacts other signs. For example, constellations that are considered compatible with each other may have similar values and interests, while incompatible constellations may have conflicting personalities and ways of communicating.

Chinese zodiac compatibility grid
Sign	Best match (compatible). 4 Trines (San He - 三合).	Best match (compatible). Six Harmonies (Liu He - 六合).	Average match (friendly).	Worst match (conflict). Six Offending Groups (Liu Chong - 六冲).	Harmful (best avoid). Six Harming Groups (Liu Hai - 六害).	Punishment Groups (Xiang Xing - 相刑). More harmful than harming and offending.
Rat	Dragon, Monkey	Ox	Pig, Tiger, Dog, Snake, Rooster, Rat	Horse	Goat	Rabbit
Ox	Snake, Rooster	Rat	Monkey, Dog, Rabbit, Tiger, Dragon, Pig, Ox	Goat	Horse	
Tiger	Horse, Dog	Pig	Tiger, Rabbit, Dragon, Rooster, Rat, Goat, Ox	Monkey	Snake	
Rabbit	Goat, Pig	Dog	Tiger, Monkey, Rabbit, Ox, Horse, Snake	Rooster	Dragon	Rat
Dragon	Rat, Monkey	Rooster	Tiger, Snake, Horse, Goat, Pig, Ox	Dog	Rabbit	Dragon
Snake	Ox, Rooster	Monkey	Horse, Dragon, Goat, Dog, Rabbit, Rat, Snake	Pig	Tiger	
Horse	Tiger, Dog	Goat	Snake, Rabbit, Dragon, Pig, Monkey	Rat	Ox	Rooster
Goat	Rabbit, Pig	Horse	Snake, Goat, Dragon, Monkey, Rooster, Dog, Tiger	Ox	Rat	
Monkey	Rat, Dragon	Snake	Monkey, Dog, Ox, Goat, Rabbit, Rooster, Horse	Tiger	Pig	
Rooster	Ox, Snake	Dragon	Goat, Pig, Tiger, Monkey, Rat	Rabbit	Dog	Horse
Dog	Tiger, Horse	Rabbit	Monkey, Pig, Rat, Ox, Snake, Goat, Dog	Dragon	Rooster	
Pig	Rabbit, Goat	Tiger	Rat, Rooster, Dog, Dragon, Horse, Ox	Snake	Monkey	Pig

== Origin stories ==
Many stories and fables explain the beginning of the zodiac. Since the Han dynasty, the twelve Earthly Branches have been used to record the time of day. However, for entertainment and convenience, they were replaced by the twelve animals, and a mnemonic refers to the behavior of the animals:

Earthly Branches may refer to a double-hour period. In the latter case it is the center of the period; for instance, 馬 mǎ (Horse) means noon as well as a period from 11:00 to 13:00.

Animal	Name of the period	Period	This is the time when...
Rat	子時 Zǐshí	23:00 to 00:59	Rats are most active in seeking food. Rats also have a different number of digits on front and hind legs, thus earning Rat the symbol of "turn over" or "new start"
Ox	丑時 Chǒushí	01:00 to 02:59	Oxen begin to chew the cud slowly and comfortably
Tiger	寅時 Yínshí	03:00 to 04:59	Tigers hunt their prey more and show their ferocity
Rabbit	卯時 Mǎoshí	05:00 to 06:59	The Jade Rabbit is busy pounding herbal medicine on the Moon according to the tale
Dragon	辰時 Chénshí	07:00 to 08:59	Dragons are hovering in the sky to give rain
Snake	巳時 Sìshí	09:00 to 10:59	Snakes are leaving their caves
Horse	午時 Wǔshí	11:00 to 12:59	The sun is high overhead and while other animals are lying down for a rest, horses are still standing
Goat	未時 Wèishí	13:00 to 14:59	Goats eat grass and urinate frequently
Monkey	申時 Shēnshí	15:00 to 16:59	Monkeys are lively
Rooster	酉時 Yǒushí	17:00 to 18:59	Roosters begin to get back to their coops
Dog	戌時 Xūshí	19:00 to 20:59	Dogs carry out their duty of guarding the houses
Pig	亥時 Hàishí	21:00 to 22:59	Pigs are sleeping sweetly

=== Great Race ===
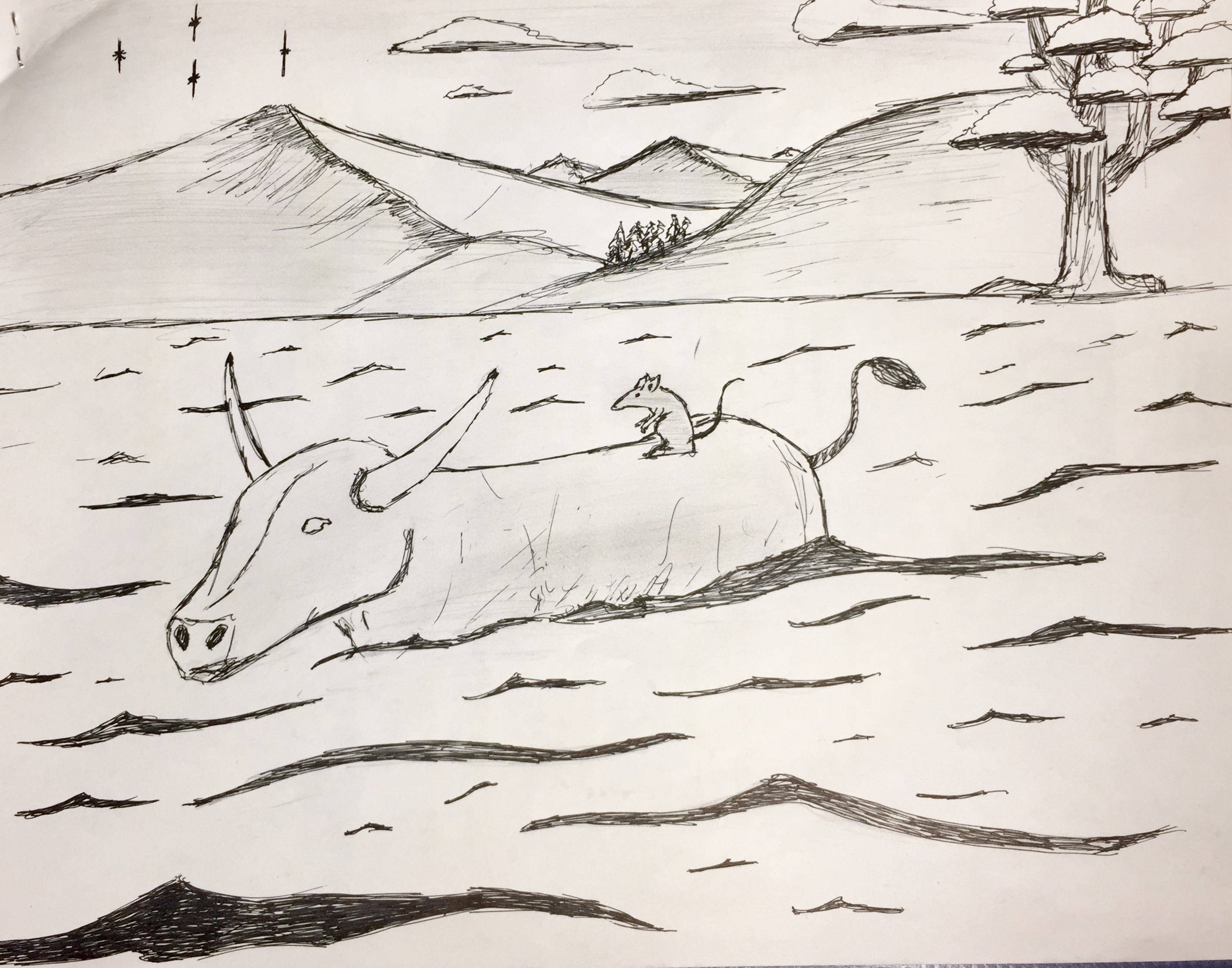
This image depicts a scene from "The Great Race" folk story, in which the Ox carries the Rat across the river.

An ancient folktale called "The Great Race" tells of the Jade Emperor's decree that the years on the calendar would be named for each animal in the order they reached him. To get there, the animals would have to cross a river.

The Cat and the Rat were not good at swimming, but they were both quite intelligent. They decided that the best and fastest way to cross the river was to hop on the back of the Ox. The Ox, being kindhearted and naive, agreed to carry them both across. As the Ox was about to reach the other side of the river, the Rat pushed the Cat into the water, and then jumped off the Ox and rushed to the Jade Emperor. It was named as the first animal of the zodiac calendar. The Ox had to settle for second place.

The third animal to come was the Tiger. Even though it was strong and powerful, it admitted to the Jade Emperor that the currents were pushing it downstream.

Suddenly, a thump sound came from the distance, signaling the arrival of the Rabbit. It explained how it crossed the river: by jumping from one stone to another in a nimble fashion. Halfway through, it thought it might lose the race, but it was lucky enough to grab hold of a floating log that later washed it to shore. For that, it became the fourth animal in the zodiac cycle.

In fifth place was the flying Dragon. The Jade Emperor wondered why a swift, airborne creature such as the Dragon did not come in first place. The Dragon explained that it had to stop by a village and bring rain for all the people, and therefore it was held back. Then, on its way to the finish, it saw the helpless Rabbit clinging onto a log, so it did a good deed and gave a puff of breath in the poor creature's direction so that it could land on the shore. The Jade Emperor was astonished by the Dragon's good nature, and it was named as the fifth animal of the zodiac.

As soon as the Dragon arrived, there came a galloping sound, and the Horse appeared. Hidden on the Horse's hoof was the Snake, whose sudden appearance gave the Horse a fright, thus making it fall back and giving the Snake the sixth spot while the Horse placed seventh.

After a while, the Goat, Monkey, and Rooster came to the river blocking the heavenly gate. The Rooster found a raft, and the Monkey and the Goat tugged and pulled, trying to get all the weeds out of the way. With combined efforts, they managed to arrive to the other side. The Jade Emperor was pleased with their teamwork and decided to name the Goat as the eighth animal, followed by the Monkey and then the Rooster.

The eleventh animal placed in the zodiac cycle was the Dog. Although it should have been the best swimmer and runner, it spent its time playing in the river water. Its explanation for being late was that it needed a good bath after a long journey, but it almost did not make it to the finish line.

Right when the Jade Emperor was going to end the race, an oink sound was heard: it was the Pig. The Pig felt hungry in the middle of the race, so it stopped, ate something, and then fell asleep. After it awoke, it finished the race in twelfth place, making it the last animal to arrive.

The Cat eventually drowned and failed to become part of the zodiac. It is said that this is the reason why cats hate water. It is also the reason for the rivalry between the Cat and Rat, as it was the Rat's callous act to push the Cat into the river.

==== Variations ====
Another version of the folktale tells that the Rat deceived the Ox into letting it jump on its back by promising the Ox that it could hear the Rat sing, before jumping off at the finish line and finishing first. Another variant says that the Rat cheated the Cat out its place at the finish line, by hiding on the back of the Dog, who was too focused to notice that he had a stow-away. The Cat tried to attack the rat in retaliation, but hurt the Dog by accident. This is said to account for the antagonistic dynamic between cats and rats, beyond normal predator and prey behavior, and also why dogs and cats fight.

In Chinese mythology, a story tells that the Cat was tricked by the Rat so it could not go to the banquet. This is why the Cat is ultimately not part of the Chinese zodiac.

In Buddhist legend Gautama Buddha summoned all animals of the Earth to come before him before his departure from this Earth, but only twelve animals came to bid him farewell. To reward these animals, he named a year after each of them in the order they had arrived.

The twelve animals of the Chinese zodiac were developed in the early stages of Chinese civilization, so therefore it is difficult to investigate its real origins. Most historians agree that the Cat is not included, as cats had not yet been introduced to China from India with the arrival of Buddhism. However until recently, the Vietnamese moved away from their traditional texts and literature and, unlike all other countries who follow the Sino lunar calendar, include the Cat instead of the Rabbit as a zodiac animal. The most common explanation is that cats are worshipped by farmers in East Asia, believing that cats' luck and prosperity protects their crops. Another popular cultural reason is that the ancient word for rabbit (Mao) sounds like cat (Meo).

=== The 36 Temporal Beasts ===
A variation of the double-hour system surfaced in the Sui dynasty. A monk by the name of Zhiyi (智顗) compiled a foundational text for the Tiantai School of Buddhism, and called it the Mohe Zhiguan (摩訶止觀, Great Calming and Contemplation). In this text was a system called the Thirty-Six Beasts (三十六獸, Sānshíliù Shòu), also called the Thirty-Six Animals (三十六禽, Sānshíliù Qín) or Thirty-Six Time Beasts (三十六時獸).

The core shifting idea of this text was that each of the twelve earthly branches (the twelve two-hour periods of the day) was associated not with one animal, but with three; consequently, this meant there was a different animal associated with every 40-minute timespan throughout the day. Thus, the number of animals present was changed from 12 to 36 animals. The system was used in Buddhist meditation: these animals were thought to appear during different periods of the day to disturb the practitioner's concentration, and a specific spell (咒, zhòu) was prescribed to subdue them.

The list is organized by the twelve earthly branches and grouped into four sets of nine, each governed by one of the Four Elements (Wood, Fire, Metal, Water; Earth is excluded) and a cardinal direction. Each branch has three animals, corresponding to the morning (旦), midday (晝), and evening (暮) periods. There is no animal corresponding to midnight.

Direction & Element		Earthly Branch			Morning (旦)		Midday (晝)		Evening (暮)	
Direction & Element		Chinese term	Zodiac Animal	Time Period	Chinese term	Animal	Chinese term	Animal	Chinese term	Animal
East	Wood (木)	寅 (Yín)	Tiger	03:00 to 04:59	狸 (Lí)	Raccoon dog / Leopard cat	豹 (Bào)	Leopard	虎 (Hǔ)	Tiger
East	Wood (木)	卯 (Mǎo)	Rabbit	05:00 to 06:59	狐 (Hú)	Fox / Hedgehog	兔 (Tù)	Rabbit	貉 (Hé)	Raccoon dog / Badger
East	Wood (木)	辰 (Chén)	Dragon	07:00 to 08:59	龍 (Lóng)	Dragon	蛟 (Jiāo)	Scaled dragon	魚 (Yú)	Fish
South	Fire (火)	巳 (Sì)	Snake	09:00 to 10:59	蟬 (Chán)	Cicada / Earthworm	鯉 (Lǐ)	Carp	蛇 (Shé)	Snake
South	Fire (火)	午 (Wǔ)	Horse	11:00 to 12:59	鹿 (Lù)	Deer	馬 (Mǎ)	Horse	獐 (Zhāng)	Water deer / Musk Deer
South	Fire (火)	未 (Wèi)	Goat	13:00 to 14:59	羊 (Yáng)	Sheep	雁 (Yàn)	Wild goose	鷹 (Yīng)	Eagle
West	Metal (金)	申 (Shēn)	Monkey	15:00 to 16:59	狖 (Yòu)	Gibbon	猿 (Yuán)	Ape	猴 (Hóu)	Monkey
West	Metal (金)	酉 (Yǒu)	Rooster	17:00 to 18:59	烏 (Wū)	Crow	雞 (Jī)	Chicken	雉 (Zhì)	Pheasant
West	Metal (金)	戌 (Xū)	Dog	19:00 to 20:59	狗 (Gǒu)	Dog	狼 (Láng)	Wolf	豺 (Chái)	Jackal
North	Water (水)	亥 (Hài)	Pig	21:00 to 22:59	豕 (Shǐ)	Pig / Boar	貐 (Yǔ)	Mythical pig-like beast	豬 (Zhū)	Domestic pig
North	Water (水)	子 (Zǐ)	Rat	23:00 to 00:59	貓 (Māo)	Cat	鼠 (Shǔ)	Rat	伏翼 (Fúyì)	Bat
North	Water (水)	丑 (Chǒu)	Ox	01:00 to 02:59	牛 (Niú)	Ox	蟹 (Xiè)	Crab	鱉 (Biē)	Soft-shelled turtle

- The table above follows the standard list from the Mohe Zhiguan as recorded in the Fo Guang Dictionary of Buddhism (FGDB), formalized by the Fo Guang Shan. The exact order and identification of some animals vary slightly between sources.
  - For example, the Ming dynasty scholar 張鼎思 (Zhang Dingxi)'s 琅邪代醉编 (Langya Daizui Bian) lists the 子 (Rat) branch including the 燕 (swallow) as the Evening beast, relocating the bat and rat down the line, eliminating the cat; the Ox branch features a 水牛 (water buffalo) and a 兕牛 (rhinoceros); the 亥 (Pig) branch features a 蒿猪 (Porcupine).
  - A Chinese document known as the 放馬灘秦簡 (Fangmatan Bamboo Slips) contain a complete Thirty-Six Beast system that predates the Buddhist Mohe Zhiguan by centuries. It lists the 卯 (Rabbit) branch including a Chicken (雞), the 丑 (Ox) branch including a 旄牛 (Yak), and the 寅 (Tiger) branch including a 豺 (Jackal) instead of the expected Tiger.

== Adaptations ==
The Chinese zodiac signs are also used by cultures other than Chinese. For example, they usually appear on Korean New Year and Japanese New Year's cards and stamps. The United States Postal Service and several other countries' postal services issue a "Year of the ____" postage stamp each year to honor this Chinese heritage.

The zodiac is widely used in commercial culture, for example, in the Chinese New Year market, and popular zodiac-related products, such as crafts, toys, books, accessories, and paintings and Chinese lunar coins. The coins depict zodiac animals, inspired the Canadian Silver Maple Leaf coins, as well as varieties from Australia, South Korea, and Mongolia.

The Chinese zodiac is also used in some Asian countries that were under the cultural influence of China. However, some of the animals in the zodiac may differ by country.

=== Asian ===
The Korean zodiac includes the Sheep (yang) instead of the Goat (which would be yeomso), although the Chinese source of the loanword yang may refer to any goat-antelope.

The Japanese zodiac includes the Sheep (hitsuji) instead of the Goat (which would be yagi), and the Wild boar (inoshishi, i) instead of the Pig (buta). Since 1873, the Japanese have celebrated the Japanese New Year on 1 January as per the Gregorian calendar.

The Filipino zodiac includes the Ram/Sheep (tupa) instead of the Goat, for the Filipino-Chinese source of the loanword tupa may refer to any goat-antelope.

The Vietnamese zodiac varies from the Chinese zodiac with the second animal being the Water Buffalo instead of the Ox, and the fourth animal being the Cat instead of the Rabbit.

The Cambodian zodiac is exactly identical to that of the Chinese although the dragon is interchangeable with the Neak (nāga) Cambodian sea snake. Sheep and Goat are interchangeable as well. The Cambodian New Year is celebrated in April, rather than in January or February as it is in China and most countries.

The Cham zodiac uses the same order as the Chinese zodiac.

Similarly the Malay zodiac replaces the Rabbit with the mousedeer (pelanduk) and the Pig with the tortoise (kura or kura-kura). The Dragon (Loong) is normally equated with the nāga but it is sometimes called Big Snake (ular besar) while the Snake sign is called Second Snake (ular sani). This is also recorded in a 19th-century manuscript compiled by John Leyden.

The Thai zodiac includes a nāga in place of the Dragon and begins, not at the Chinese New Year, but either on the first day of the fifth month in the Thai lunar calendar, or during the Songkran New Year festival (now celebrated every 13–15 April), depending on the purpose of the use. Historically, Lan Na (Kingdom around Northern Thailand) also replaces pig with elephant. While modern Thai have returned to pig, its name is still กุน (gu̜n), retaining the actual word for elephant in the zodiac.

The Gurung zodiac in Nepal includes a Cow instead of an Ox, a Cat instead of Rabbit, an Eagle instead of a Dragon (Loong), a Bird instead of a Rooster, and a Deer instead of a Pig.

The Bulgar calendar used from the 2nd century and that has been only partially reconstructed uses a similar sixty-year cycle of twelve animal-named years groups.

The Old Mongol calendar uses the Rat, the Ox, the Leopard, the Hare, the Crocodile, the Serpent, the Horse, the Sheep, the Monkey, the Hen, the Dog and the Hog.

The Tibetan calendar replaces the Rooster with the bird.

The Volga Bulgars, Kazars and other Turkic peoples replaced some animals by local fauna: Leopard (instead of Tiger), Fish or Crocodile (instead of Dragon/Loong), Elephant (instead of Pig).

In the Persian version of the Eastern zodiac brought by Mongols during the Middle Ages, the Chinese word lóng and Mongol word lū (Dragon) was translated as nahang meaning "water beast", and may refer to any dangerous aquatic animal both mythical and real (crocodiles, hippos, sharks, sea serpents, etc.). In the 20th century the term nahang is used almost exclusively as meaning Whale, thus switching the Loong for the Whale in the Persian variant and Cat instead of Rabbit and Bird instead of Rooster.

In the traditional Kazakh version of the twelve-year animal cycle (Kazakh: мүшел, müşel), the Dragon is replaced by a snail (Kazakh: ұлу, ulw), and the Tiger appears as a leopard (Kazakh: барыс, barıs). Cat instead of Rabbit. Deer instead of Pig.

In the Kyrgyz version of the Chinese zodiac (Kyrgyz: мүчөл, müçöl) the words for the Dragon (Kyrgyz: улуу, uluu), Monkey (Kyrgyz: мечин, meçin) and Tiger (Kyrgyz: барс, bars) are only found in Chinese zodiac names, other animal names include Cow, Rabbit, Snake, Horse, Sheep, Chicken, Dog and Wild boar.

In the Turkish version of zodiac, the animals are almost the same, but it replaces Tiger with Leopard (Pars), Dragon with Fish (Balık) and Goat with Sheep (Koyun). Cat instead of Rabbit and Bird instead of Rooster. Remarkably, the practise of zodiac persisted since the Ottoman Empire, including the presence of Pig (Domuz) despite contradicting Islamic rule.

Chinese Zodiac by Ethnic Group
Ethnic Group	1	2	3	4	5	6	7	8	9	10	11	12
Chinese	Rat	Ox	Tiger	Rabbit	Dragon	Snake	Horse	Goat	Monkey	Rooster	Dog	Pig
Korean	Rat	Ox	Tiger	Rabbit	Dragon	Snake	Horse	Sheep	Monkey	Rooster	Dog	Pig
Japanese	Rat	Ox	Tiger	Rabbit	Dragon	Snake	Horse	Sheep	Monkey	Rooster	Dog	Wild Boar
Filipino	Rat	Ox	Tiger	Rabbit	Dragon	Snake	Horse	Ram / Sheep	Monkey	Rooster	Dog	Pig
Vietnamese	Rat	Water Buffalo	Tiger	Cat	Dragon	Snake	Horse	Goat	Monkey	Rooster	Dog	Pig
Cambodian	Rat	Ox	Tiger	Rabbit	Nāga	Snake	Horse	Goat	Monkey	Rooster	Dog	Pig
Cham	Rat	Ox	Tiger	Rabbit	Dragon	Snake	Horse	Goat	Turtle	Rooster	Dog	Pig
Malay	Rat	Ox	Tiger	Mouse deer	Dragon	Snake	Horse	Goat	Monkey	Rooster	Dog	Tortoise
Thai	Rat	Ox	Tiger	Rabbit	Nāga	Snake	Horse	Goat	Monkey	Rooster	Dog	Pig
Lanna (Thai)	Rat	Ox	Tiger	Rabbit	Nāga	Snake	Horse	Goat	Monkey	Rooster	Dog	Elephant
Nepali	Rat	Cow	Tiger	Cat	Eagle	Snake	Horse	Sheep	Monkey	Bird	Dog	Deer
Bulgar	Rat	Ox	Tiger / Wolf	Rabbit	Dragon	Snake	Horse	Ram	Monkey	Rooster	Dog	Boar
Old Mongolian	Rat	Ox	Leopard	Hare	Alligator	Serpent	Horse	Sheep	Monkey	Hen	Dog	Hog
Tibetan	Rat	Ox	Tiger	Rabbit	Dragon	Snake	Horse	Goat	Monkey	Bird	Dog	Pig
Kazars	Camel	Ox	Leopard	Rabbit / Cat	Fish / Alligator	Snake	Horse	Goat	Hedgehog	Rooster	Dog	Elephant
Persian	Rat	Ox	Tiger	Cat	Whale	Snake	Horse	Goat	Monkey	Bird	Dog	Pig
Kazakhs	Mole	Ox	Leopard	Cat	Snail	Snake	Horse	Goat	Monkey	Rooster	Dog	Deer
Azerbaijani	Rat	Ox	Tiger	Rabbit	Dragon	Snake	Horse	Goat	Monkey	Rooster	Dog	Pig/Wild Boar
Kyrgyz	Mouse	Cow	Tiger	Rabbit	Dragon	Snake	Horse	Sheep	Monkey	Chicken	Dog	Wild Boar
Turkmen	Mouse	Cow	Tiger	Rabbit	Dragon / Fish	Snake	Horse	Sheep	Monkey	Chicken	Dog	Pig
Turkish	Rat	Ox	Leopard	Cat	Fish	Snake	Horse	Sheep	Monkey	Bird	Dog	Pig

Chinese Zodiac by Ethnic Group (Native Names)
Ethnic Group	1	2	3	4	5	6	7	8	9	10	11	12
Cham	Tikuh	Kubao	Rimaong	Tapay	Inagirai	Ulanaih	Athaih	Pabaiy	Kra	Manuk	Athau	Papwiy
Cham	ꨓꨪꨆꨭꩍ	ꨆꨭꨯꨝꨱ	ꨣꨪꨠꨯꨱꨮ	ꨓꨚꩈ	꩓ꨘꨈꨪꨣꨰ	ꨂꨤꨘꨰꩍ	ꨀꨔꨰꩍ	ꨚꨝꨰꩈ	ꨆꨴ	ꨠꨘꨭꩀ	ꨀꨔꨭꨮ	ꨚꩇꨥꨪꩈ
Malay	Tikus	Kerbau	Harimau	Pelanduk	Naga	Ular	Kuda	Kambing	Monyet	Ayam Jantan	Anjing	Kura-kura
Malay	تيکوس	کرباو	ريماو	ڤلندوق	اولر بسر	اولر ثاني	کودا	کمبيڠ	موڽيت	أيم	أنجيڠ	کورا
Filipino	Daga	Baka	Tigre	Kuneho	Dragón	Ahas	Kabayo	Kambing / Tupa	Unggoy	Manok Tandang	Aso	Baboy
Filipino	ᜇᜄ	ᜊᜃ	ᜆᜒᜄ᜔ᜇᜒ	ᜃᜓᜈᜒᜑᜓ	ᜇ᜔ᜇᜄᜓᜈ᜔	ᜀᜑᜐ᜔	ᜃᜊᜌᜓ	ᜃᜋ᜔ᜊᜒᜅ᜔/ᜆᜓᜉ	ᜂᜅ᜔ᜄᜓᜌ᜔	'ᜋᜈᜓᜃ᜔ ᜆᜈ᜔ᜇᜅ᜔'	ᜀᜐᜓ	ᜊᜊᜓᜌ᜔
Bulgar	Somor	Shegor	Ver?	Dvan[sh]	Ver[eni]?	Dilom	Imen[shegor]?	Teku[chitem] ?		Toh	Eth	Dohs
Turkmen	Syçan	Sygyr	Bars	Towşan	Luw~balyk	Ýylan	Ýylky	Goýun	Bijin	Towuk	It	Doňuz
Turkmen	سیچان	سیغر	بارس	طاوشان	لو~بالیق	ییلان	یلقی	قویون	بیجین	طاویق	ایت	دونگغز

== English translation ==
Due to confusion with synonyms during translation, some of the animals depicted by the English words did not exist in ancient China. For example:

- The term 鼠 Rat can be translated as Mouse, as there are no distinctive words for the two genera in Chinese. However, Rat is the most commonly used one among all the synonyms.
- The term 牛 Ox, a castrated Bull, can be translated interchangeably with other terms related to Cattle (male Bull, female Cow) and Buffalo. However, Ox is the most commonly used one among all the synonyms.
- The term 卯 Rabbit can be translated as Hare, as 卯 (and 兔) do not distinguish between the two genera of leporids. As hares are native to China and most of Asia and rabbits are not, this would be more accurate. However, in colloquial English Rabbit can encompass hares as well.
- The term 蛇 Snake can be translated as Serpent, which refers to a large species of snake and has the same behavior, although this term is rarely used.
- The term 羊 Goat can be translated interchangeably with other terms related to Sheep (male Ram, female Ewe). However, Goat is the most commonly used one among all the synonyms.
- The term 雞 Rooster can be translated interchangeably with Chicken, as well as the female Hen. However, Rooster is the most commonly used one among all the synonyms in English-speaking countries.

== Gallery ==
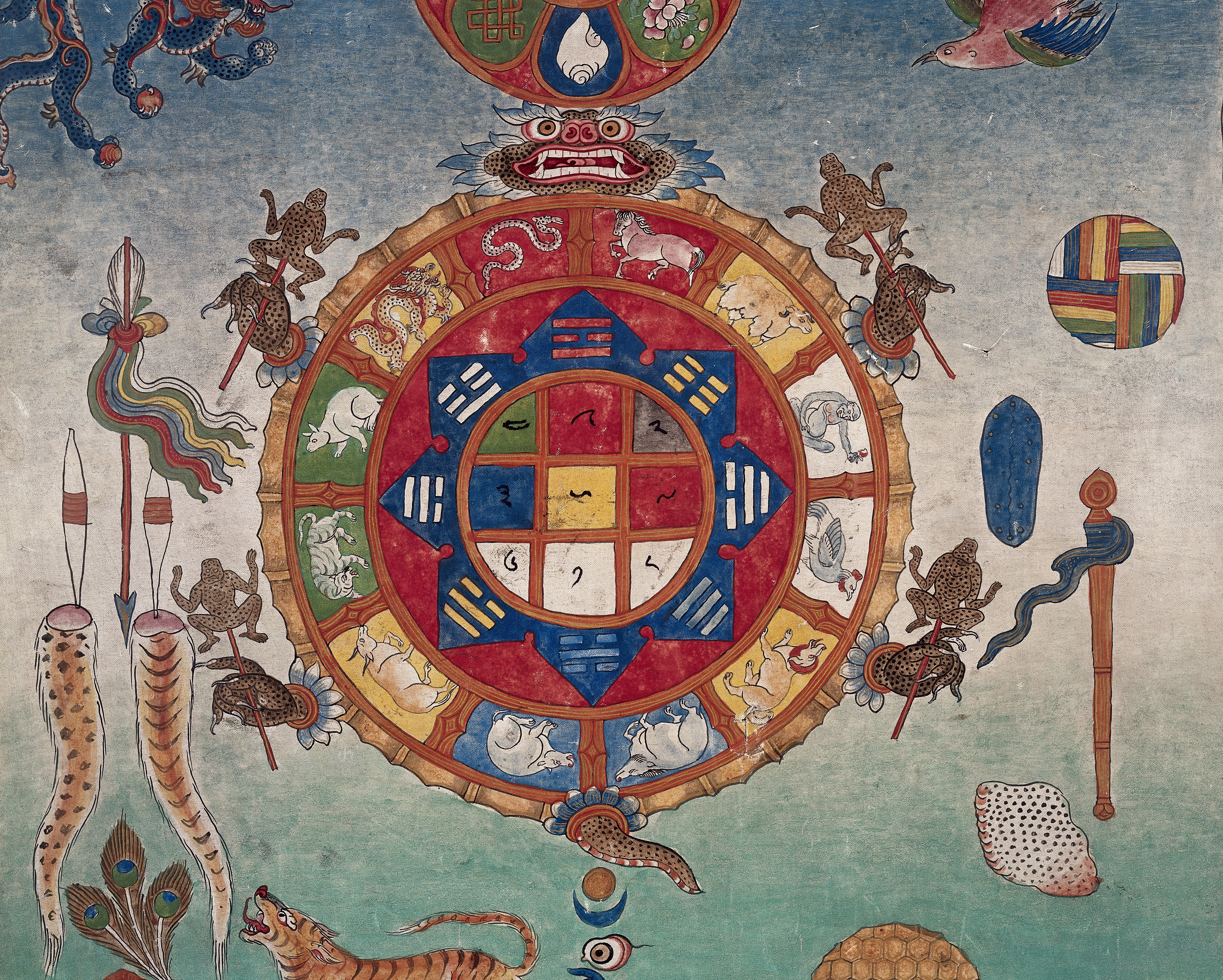
A chart indicating good and bad bloodletting days and when to guard against demons.

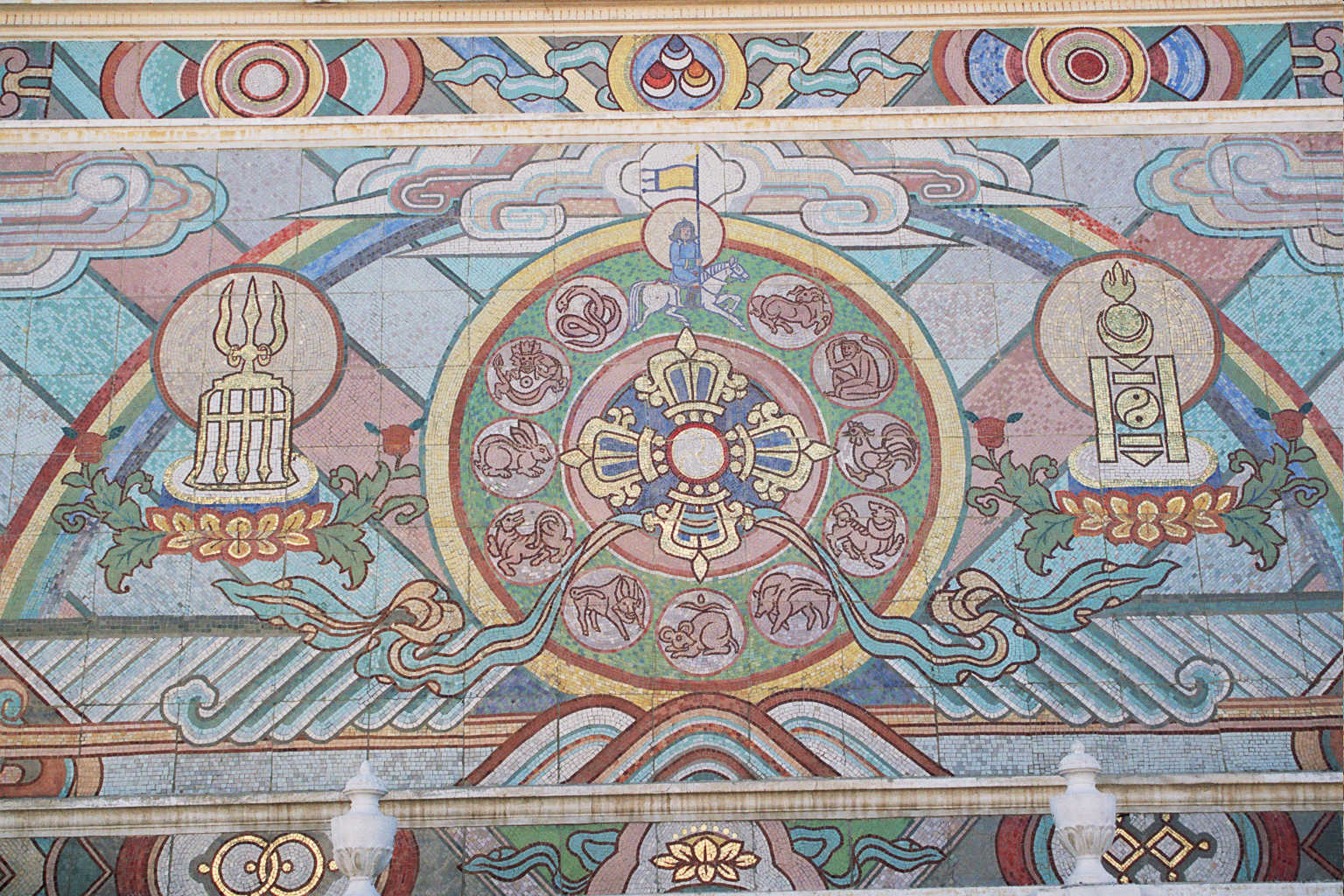
Soyombo and several Buddhist, Tengrist, and Chinese zodiac symbols in a wall mosaic.

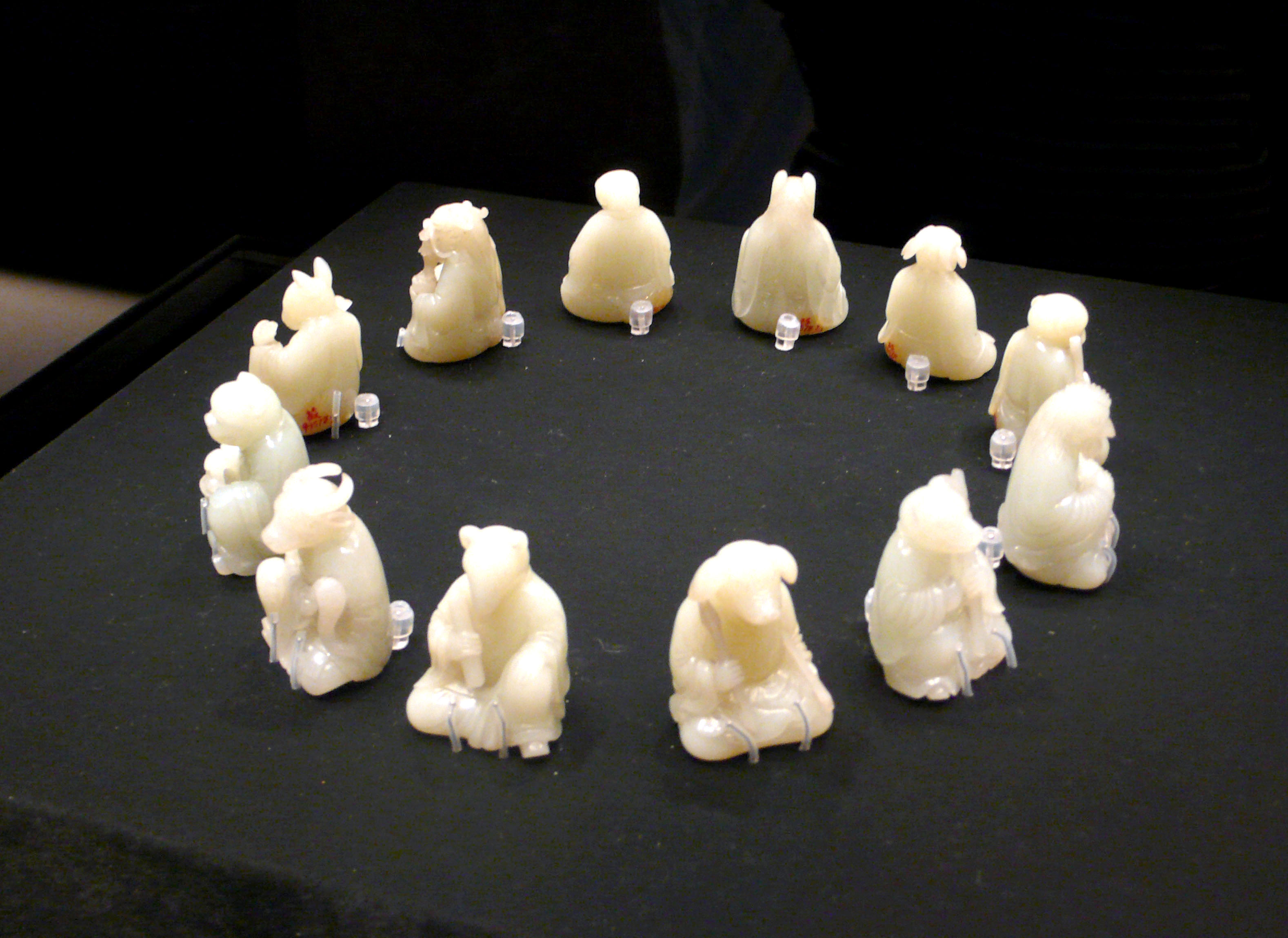
Twelve Chinese zodiac jade figurines. Capital Museum, Beijing, China.

== See also ==
- Chinese animal symbolism
  - Twenty-Eight Mansions
  - Four Symbols
  - Four Holy Beasts
  - Five Poisons
  - Four Perils
  - Animal fighting styles
- Astrology and science
- Chinese spiritual world concepts
