= Down by the Water =

Down by the Water may refer to:

- Down by the Water (PJ Harvey song)
- Down by the Water (The Decemberists song)
- "Down by the Water", by Amy Macdonald from Under Stars, 2017
- "Down by the Water", by the Drums from Summertime!, 2009
