= Wild Goose Pagoda =

Wild Goose Pagoda may refer to two different Buddhist pagodas in Xi'an, Shaanxi, China:

- Giant Wild Goose Pagoda, in Yanta District, Xi'an
- Small Wild Goose Pagoda, in Beilin District, Xi'an

== See also ==
- Yanta District, Xi'an, literally "Wild Goose Pagoda District", named after the pagoda
- Wild Goose (disambiguation)
