= Wild Goose =

Wild Goose may refer to:

- Non-domesticated goose
- Wild Goose, Ontario, a community of the township of Shuniah, Ontario, Canada
- Wild Goose (beer), a brand of beer of the Logan Shaw Brewing Company
- Greylag goose, or wild goose
- The Wild Goose, a hand-written newspaper created in 1867 by Fenian prisoners
- HMS Wild Goose (U45), a 1942 Royal Navy Black Swan-class sloop
- USS Wild Goose (SP-562), a US Navy patrol vessel in commission from 1917 to 1920
- USS YMS-328, later Wild Goose, a US Navy minesweeper converted to a yacht, once owned by John Wayne
- The Wild Goose, a 1919 novel by Gouverneur Morris
- The Wild Goose (film), a 1921 American film directed by Albert Capellani
- The Cry of the Wild Goose, a 1950 popular song performed by Frankie Laine
- Wild Goose, a 1977 novel by Mary Wibberley

== See also ==
- Wild Goose Café, a charity project in Bristol, England, United Kingdom
- Wild Goose Farm, a historic property in Jefferson County, West Virginia
- Wild Goose Festival, a 4-day festival at the intersection of justice, spirituality, music and art.
- Giant Wild Goose Pagoda, a Buddhist pagoda in Xi'an, Shaanxi, China
- Small Wild Goose Pagoda, a pagoda in Xi'an, China
- USS Wild Goose II (SP-891), a US Navy patrol vessel in service from 1917 to 1920
- Wild Goose Publishing, the publishing group of Iona Community
- Wild Geese (disambiguation)
- Wild-goose chase (disambiguation)
- Goose (disambiguation)
