= What You Were =

What You Were may refer to:

- "What You Were", a song by Angels of Light from Everything Is Good Here/Please Come Home, 2003
- "What You Were", a song by the Cranberries from a re-release of Everybody Else Is Doing It, So Why Can't We?, 2002
- "What You Were", a song by the Drums from Portamento, 2011
