= Encyclopedia (album) =

Studio album by The Drums
- Released: September 23, 2014
- Genre: Indie pop, post-punk revival, dream pop
- Label: Norman Records
- Producer: The Drums

The Drums chronology
Portamento (2011)	Encyclopedia (2014)	Abysmal Thoughts (2017)

Singles from Encyclopedia
- 1. "Magic Mountain" Released: July 22, 2014; 2. "I Can't Pretend" Released: August 26, 2014

Encyclopedia is the third studio album of American indie pop band The Drums. It was released on September 23, 2014, by Minor Records.

It was the first album of the band released by Jonny Pierce and Jacob Graham as a duo.

== Background ==
Prior to the release of the band's second album Portamento, it was announced that guitarist Adam Kessler had left The Drums and that many "shouting matches" had occurred between its members, which nearly caused a break-up. During the band's 2012 tour, former drummer and guitarist, Connor Hanwick, left the band. The Drums was then put on a hold, and both Jonny Pierce and Jacob Graham focused on their side projects. On one side, Pierce announced that he would start a solo career; in November 2012 he released his first solo track "I Didn't Realise" and announced that he would be releasing his first solo album in 2013. Jacob Graham also started working on his side project Cascading Slopes, releasing their first album Towards a Quaker View of Synthesizers in November 2013. This same month, however, Pierce announced the postponement of the release of his first solo album, to be entitled Queen Nail, as he and Graham had started working on a new Drums album.

Pierce and Graham recorded the album in a cabin in New York, and then in Williamsburg's Scientific Laboratories rehearsal studio. They described the process of working again as a duo, the first time since the band's first EP Summertime!, enjoying more freedom in the creative process, as they set the goal of changing any preconceived ideas about the band "and make songs to be as grand and majestic as we want them to be." On February 16, 2014, they announced on their official Facebook page that the third album was finished. Pierce described the album as a "rude awakening," while Graham described the album as "interesting and bizarre." On July 8, 2014, "Magic Mountain," their first new song in three years, was revealed via SoundCloud. The song was released digitally on July 22, 2014. The album's second single, "I Can't Pretend", was released on August 26, 2014.

== Critical reception ==
Professional ratings
Aggregate scores
Source	Rating
Metacritic	61/100
Review scores
Source	Rating
Allmusic	3/5 stars
NME	6/10 stars
Pitchfork	5.9/10

According to review aggregator website Metacritic, the album received an average critic review score of 61/100, based on 13 reviews, indicating "generally favorable reviews". The first song revealed from Encyclopedia, "Magic Mountain," surprised music critics and fans alike: it was described as "stirring and unexpected", and as "a definite departure from The Drums' earlier formulas," The song caused considerable debate amongst fans about the new direction the band were getting at. Heather Phares from AllMusic described the song as "between its buzzsaw guitars and Pierce's yelp, [it] sounds more like the Pixies than anything from their previous albums [...] it's a bracingly weird, strangely catchy two-minute song that, unfortunately, goes on for four minutes." Pitchfork described "Magic Mountain" as "The Drums' loudest song to date [...] that posits Encyclopedia as a potentially evil twin of their bleach blonde self-titled debut from 2010."

AllMusic's Heather Phare considered the album a riskier attempt than Portamento, although "with notably uneven results", and recognized as a problem that the band has not delivered anything as good as the initial formula that gave them popularity at their beginnings. She notes the influence of Graham's synth work from his solo project Cascading Slopes in the album, "which aims for experimental but ends up sounding unfinished." On the other hand, she cites "I Can't Pretend" as one of the highlights of the album, along with "There Is Nothing Left", which she describes as "one of the best updates of their sound yet."

== Track listing ==
No.	Title	Writer(s)	Length
1.	"Magic Mountain"	Jonny Pierce, Jacob Graham	4:05
2.	"I Can't Pretend"	Pierce, Graham, Johnny Aries	4:49
3.	"I Hope Time Doesn't Change Him"	Pierce, Graham, Aries	4:43
4.	"Kiss Me Again"	Pierce	3:45
5.	"Let Me"	Pierce	4:33
6.	"Break My Heart"	Pierce, Graham, Aries	3:29
7.	"Face of God"	Pierce	4:01
8.	"U.S. National Park"	Pierce, Graham, Aries	3:11
9.	"Deep In My Heart"	Pierce	3:50
10.	"Bell Laboratories"	Pierce, Graham	2:45
11.	"There Is Nothing Left"	Pierce, Graham	4:07
12.	"Wild Geese"	Graham	5:15

== Personnel ==
- Management – Asif Ahmed Andrew Mishko
- Mastered By – Adam Boose
- Mixed By – Eric Brouceck
- Vocals, electric guitar, bass guitar, drums, synthesizer – Jonny Pierce
- Synthesizer, orchestral arrangement, guitar, backing vocals – Jacob Graham
- Guitar – Johnny Aries

== Charts ==
Chart (2014)	Peak position
US Heatseekers Albums (Billboard)	10
US Independent Albums (Billboard)	43
Japanese Albums (Oricon)	131
