= Elkland (band) =

American band

- Origin: Horseheads, New York, U.S.
- Genres: Synth-pop, new wave
- Years active: 2003–2006
- Label: Columbia
- Past members: Jonathan Pierce; Joel Tarpin; Adam Kessler; Jesse Pierce

Elkland was an American band from Horseheads, New York. Originally named Goat Explosion, the group took the new name from the nearby town of Elkland, Pennsylvania. The band was on the Columbia Records label, a division of Sony BMG Music Entertainment.

From April to June 2005, Elkland performed as the opening act for all concerts in Erasure's tour of North America.

The band's debut album, Golden was released in 2005 and has been described as "a stylish cast of '80s new wave and post-millennium modern rock" by AllMusic and "a rare new wave/synthpop gem" by Cryptic Rock.

In May 2006, Elkland split, supposedly on what singer Jon Pierce has said were amicable terms.

Immediately on the heels of the demise of Elkland, frontman Jon Pierce formed the Drums with former Goat Explosion member Jacob Graham of Orlando's Flashlight Party.

== Members ==
- Jonathan Pierce - vocals
- Joel Tarpin - keyboards/synthesizers
- Adam Kessler - guitar
- Jesse Pierce - drums

== Discography ==
=== Albums ===
Golden (2005)

1. "Put Your Hand Over Mine"
2. "Apart"
3. "It's Not Your Fault"
4. "I Never"
5. "Everybody's Leaving"
6. "Talking on the Phone"
7. "Everytime You Tell Me That You Love Me"
8. "Abandon"
9. "I Need You Tonight"
10. "Find Me"
11. "Without You"
12. "We Share a Heart"

=== Singles ===
"Apart" (2005)

1. "Apart"
2. "Salvation" (The Cranberries cover)
3. "I Think I Hate Her"
4. "Everytime You Tell Me That You Love Me"
5. "Apart" (Jacknife Lee Remix)
