= Let's Go Surfing =

Single by The Drums

from the album The Drums
- Released: 15 September 2009; 9 August 2010 (reissue)
- Recorded: 2009
- Genre: Indie pop, surf rock
- Length: 2:54
- Label: Island
- Songwriter(s): Jonathan Pierce
- Producer(s): Jonathan Pierce

The Drums singles chronology
"Let's Go Surfing" (2009)	"I Felt Stupid" (2009)
"Forever and Ever, Amen" (2010)	""Let's Go Surfing" (re-release)" (2010)	"Me and the Moon" (2010)

Music video
- "Let's Go Surfing" on YouTube

"Let's Go Surfing" is the debut single by American band the Drums, released from their self-titled debut album. The single was first released in the UK on 15 September 2009 as the lead single from the band's debut EP Summertime!, but was later re-released on 9 August 2010. On both releases, the track was released as a double A-side with the Summertime! EP exclusive track "Don't Be a Jerk, Johnny", although only the lead track received chart placement in the UK. An excerpt of the song was used in advertising for Volkswagen, and it featured frequently in the third series of the E4 coming-of-age sitcom The Inbetweeners.

In October 2011, NME placed it at number 60 on its list of the "150 Best Tracks of the Past 15 Years".

== Track listing ==
- Digital download

No.	Title	Length
1.	"Let's Go Surfing"	2:55
2.	"Don't Be a Jerk, Johnny"	4:05

== Chart performance ==
Upon its initial release in September 2009, "Let's Go Surfing" debuted on the UK Singles Chart at number 107, narrowly missing out on the top 100. However, after receiving airplay from BBC Radio 1 DJs such as Fearne Cotton, the single re-entered the top 100 at number 87 on 14 August 2010; as a result of the reissue. The single then continued to rise, climbing 20 places to number 67 the following week and eventually reaching a peak position of number 63 on 28 August 2010, marking the band's most successful single to date.

Chart (2009)	Peak position
UK Singles (Official Charts Company)	107
Chart (2010)	Peak position
UK Singles (OCC)	63

== Certifications ==
Region	Certification	Certified units/sales
United Kingdom (BPI)	Silver	200,000^{‡}
^{‡} Sales+streaming figures based on certification alone.

== Release history ==
Region	Date	Format
United Kingdom	15 September 2009	Digital download
United Kingdom	8 August 2010	Digital download
United Kingdom	9 August 2010	Vinyl
