= Jonny (The Drums album) =

- Cover used for physical releases and on Bandcamp.

Studio album by the Drums
- Released: October 13, 2023
- Genres: Indie pop; electropop; bedroom pop; post-punk; jangle pop; synth-pop
- Length: 50:57 (standard) 70:27 (deluxe)
- Label: Anti-
- Producer: Jonathan Pierce

The Drums chronology
Brutalism (2019)	Jonny (2023)

Alternative cover
- Cover used on streaming services

Singles from Jonny
- 1. "I Want It All" Released: April 3, 2023; 2. "Plastic Envelope" / "Protect Him Always" Released: May 11, 2023; 3. "Obvious" Released: June 8, 2023; 4. "Better" Released: July 12, 2023; 5. "Isolette" Released: August 16, 2023; 6. "The Flowers" Released: September 20, 2023

Jonny is the sixth studio album by American indie rock band the Drums. It was released on October 13, 2023, through Anti-.

== Background and singles ==
Ahead of its announcement, the band's current sole member Jonathan Pierce released four singles off the album: "I Want It All" on April 3, "Plastic Envelope" and "Protect Him Always" on May 11, and "Obvious" on June 8, 2023. On July 12, Pierce announced the album and shared the fifth single "Better". A tour through North America spanning six weeks also started that day. The album cover was widely noted for displaying a black-and-white photo of Pierce kneeling naked over a chair, seemingly praying.

On Jonny, Pierce mainly processes his "cult-like" upbringing and its impacts on his present self. In preparation for the record, the musician returned to his childhood home while his parents were away and took pictures of himself in rooms that held strong memories. Looking back at it, he clarified that it helped him make peace with the past, thus making it a "sacred place" for him to worship. He recalled that his first listen to the record had reflected his soul back at him. According to Pierce, the intention of the album is "to honor each and every part of you" with each song being a "hymn to the human heart".

On March 18, 2024, a deluxe edition of the album was announced, which would include five new tracks exclusively recorded for said edition. It was released on April 5, after preceding single "The Impossible" which had been released on April 1.

== Critical reception ==
Professional ratings
Aggregate scores
Source	Rating
AnyDecentMusic?	7.2/10
Metacritic	75/100
Review scores
Source	Rating
AllMusic	4/5 stars
Exclaim!	7/10
The Line of Best Fit	7/10
The Skinny	3/5 stars
Under the Radar	8/10

Jonny was met with "generally favorable" reviews from critics. At Metacritic, which assigns a weighted average rating out of 100 to reviews from mainstream publications, this release received an average score of 75, based on 8 reviews.

At Under the Radar, writer Andy Steiner gave the release an eight out of ten, calling it "the best album The Drums have made." Daniel Sylvester of Exclaim wrote: "Pierce's sixth album as the Drums is absolutely haunted by sorrow and reclamation. Whether the listener is familiar with the record's back story or not, Jonny nonetheless leaves a lasting impact."

== Track listing ==
All tracks are written by Jonathan Pierce, except where noted.

Jonny - standard edition
No.	Title	Writer(s)	Length
1.	"I Want It All"		4:55
2.	"Isolette"		2:34
3.	"I'm Still Scared"		2:13
4.	"Better"		3:48
5.	"Harms"		1:47
6.	"Little Jonny"		1:24
7.	"Plastic Envelope"		3:17
8.	"Protect Him Always"		0:54
9.	"Be Gentle"	Jonathan Pierce; Johnny Aries	3:55
10.	"Dying" (featuring Rico Nasty)	Pierce; Maria Kelly	3:39
11.	"Green Grass"	Pierce; Waylon Rector	3:57
12.	"Obvious"		3:54
13.	"The Flowers"		4:22
14.	"Teach My Body"		4:35
15.	"Pool God"		4:41
16.	"I Used to Want to Die"		1:02
Total length:			50:57

Jonny - deluxe edition bonus tracks
No.	Title	Length
17.	"I (Still) Don't Know How to Love"	4:20
18.	"The Impossible"	4:08
19.	"When Every Cell is Sad"	3:37
20.	"Noah"	2:08
21.	"Maybe I Was Wrong"	5:17
Total length:		1:10:27

Jonny - 1st anniversary reissue
No.	Title	Length
22.	"Harms - (Extended)"	4:41
Total length:		1:15:08

== Personnel ==
The Drums

- Jonathan Pierce – vocals, instrumentation, production, mixing, engineering, art direction

Additional contributors

- Joe LaPorta – mastering
- Waylon Rector – guitar (tracks 1, 3, 8, 11–14), bass guitar (4, 7, 9), acoustic guitar (7)
- Adam Markiewicz – strings (tracks 1, 2, 7, 8)
- Johnny Aries – bass guitar (tracks 4, 12–14), guitar (9, 12–14)
- Bryan DeLeon – drums (track 9)
- Maria Kelly – vocals (track 10)
- Gabe Greenland – production, engineering (track 14)
- Baltazar Jonnel Dasalla – layout, photo editing
- Abel Coss – photo editing
