= Wild Goose Chase =

Wild Goose Chase may refer to:

- Wild-goose chase, a pursuit of something unattainable or non-existent, such as in a fool's errand or snipe hunt
- The Wild Goose Chase, a comedy stage play by John Fletcher, first published 1621
- The Wild Goose Chase (1915 film), an American comedy-drama by Cecil B. DeMille
- A Wild Goose Chase a 1918 American film
- The Wild Goose Chase (1932 film), a Van Beuren cartoon
- The Wild Goose Chase (1975 film), a French film by Claude Zidi
- Wycliffe's Wild Goose Chase, a 1982 crime novel by W. J. Burley
