= USS Wild Goose II (SP-891) =

Patrol vessel of the United States Navy

History

United States
- Name: USS Wild Goose II (1917-1918); USS SP-891 (1918-1920)
- Namesake: Wild Goose II was her previous name retained; SP-891 was her section patrol number
- Builder: W. H. Chamberlain, Marblehead, Massachusetts
- Acquired: 7 July 1917
- Renamed: USS SP-891 April 1918
- Stricken: 1920
- Notes: In civilian use as Wild Goose II until July 1917

General characteristics
- Type: Patrol vessel
- Length: 33 ft 6 in (10.21 m)
- Beam: 10 ft 0 in (3.05 m)
- Draft: 2 ft 9 in (0.84 m)
- Speed: 10.0 knots
- Armament: 1 × machine gun

USS Wild Goose II (SP-891), later USS SP-891, was a United States Navy patrol vessel in service from 1917 to 1920.

Wild Goose II was built as a wooden-hulled civilian motorboat of the same name by W. H. Chamberlain at Marblehead, Massachusetts. On 7 July 1917, the U.S. Navy took delivery of her from her owner, Winthrop C. Winslow of Boston, Massachusetts, for use as a section patrol craft during World War I. She entered service as USS Wild Goose II (SP-891), although no record of her commissioning has been found.

Little is known of Wild Goose II's career. She probably was assigned to the 1st Naval District in northern New England, as her ship's post office address is known to have been in that district as of 1 November 1918. In accordance with an order dated 11 April 1918, the Navy renamed her USS SP-891 to avoid confusion with the patrol vessel USS Wild Goose (SP-562) that was in commission at the same time.

SP-891 was stricken from the Navy List in 1920.
