= Abysmal Thoughts =

Studio album by the Drums
- Released: June 16, 2017
- Genres: Indie pop, surf rock
- Length: 49:05
- Label: ANTI-

The Drums chronology
Encyclopedia (2014)	Abysmal Thoughts (2017)	Brutalism (2019)

Singles from Abysmal Thoughts
- 1. "Blood Under My Belt" Released: March 1, 2017; 2. "Heart Basel" Released: May 2, 2017; 3. "Head of the Horse" Released: May 30, 2017; 4. "Mirror" Released: June 13, 2017

Professional ratings
Aggregate scores
Source	Rating
Metacritic	77/100
Review scores
Source	Rating
The A.V. Club	A−
DIY	4/5 stars
Exclaim!	5/10 stars
God Is in the T.V.	9/10
Loud and Quiet	7/10
Paste	8.1/10
The Skinny	3/5 stars
Under the Radar	5.5/10 stars

Abysmal Thoughts is the fourth studio album by New York City indie pop project the Drums. The album was released on June 16, 2017, through ANTI-. It is their first studio album as the solo project of lead singer Jonathan Pierce.

The album was preceded by the single, "Blood Under My Belt."

== Track listing ==
No.	Title	Length
1.	"Mirror"	4:04
2.	"I'll Fight for Your Life"	3:51
3.	"Blood Under My Belt"	3:48
4.	"Heart Basel"	4:43
5.	"Shoot the Sun Down"	3:36
6.	"Head of the Horse"	4:38
7.	"Under the Ice"	3:41
8.	"Are U Fucked"	3:59
9.	"Your Tenderness"	4:57
10.	"Rich Kids"	3:07
11.	"If All We Share (Means Nothing)"	3:50
12.	"Abysmal Thoughts"	4:51
Total length:		49:05

== Charts ==
Chart (2017)	Peak position
Belgian Albums (Ultratop Wallonia)	157
UK Independent Albums (OCC)	48
US Heatseekers Albums (Billboard)	5
US Independent Albums (Billboard)	24

== Personnel ==
- Producer/Musician: Jonathan Pierce
- Engineer/Mixer: Jonathan Schenke
- Mastering: Joe LaPorta
- Management: Andrew Mishko
