= USS Wild Goose (SP-562) =

Patrol vessel of the United States Navy

History

United States
- Name: USS Wild Goose
- Namesake: Previous name retained
- Builder: Gas Engine and Power Company and Charles L. Seabury Company, Morris Heights, the Bronx, New York
- Completed: 1913
- Acquired: 21 April 1917
- Commissioned: 25 June 1917
- Fate: Sold 17 November 1920
- Notes: In civilian use as Wild Goose 1913-1917

General characteristics
- Type: Patrol vessel
- Length: 60 ft 0 in (18.29 m)
- Beam: 10 ft 0 in (3.05 m)
- Draft: 2 ft 6 in (0.76 m)
- Propulsion: Steam engine
- Speed: 19 knots
- Armament: 1 × 1-pounder gun

USS Wild Goose (SP-562) was a United States Navy patrol vessel in commission from 1917 to 1920.

Wild Goose was built as a wooden-hulled civilian screw steamer of the same name by the Gas Engine and Power Company and Charles L. Seabury Company at Morris Heights in the Bronx, New York, in 1913 to a design by Charles L. Seabury. On 21 April 1917, the U.S. Navy took delivery of her from her owner, Charles L. Harding of Boston, Massachusetts, for use as a section patrol craft during World War I. After fitting out for naval use, she was commissioned as USS Wild Goose (SP-562) on 25 June 1917.

Assigned to the 1st Naval District, Wild Goose carried out patrol duties in northern New England until transferred to the 5th Naval District in the Hampton Roads, Virginia, area at an unrecorded date. She is known to have been operating in the 5th Naval District in November 1918.

The Navy retained Wild Goose after the end of World War I. She is known to have been stationed at the Washington Navy Yard in Washington, D.C. as of 1 October 1919. On 21 June 1920, the Navy loaned her to the City of Norfolk, Virginia, which later returned her to the Navy.

The Navy placed Wild Goose on the sale list on 24 August 1920. She was sold on 17 November 1920.

Wild Goose should not be confused with another section patrol vessel, USS Wild Goose II (SP-891), which was in commission at the same time.
