= Brutalism (The Drums album) =

Studio album by the Drums
- Released: April 5, 2019
- Genres: Indie pop, dream pop, synth-pop
- Length: 35:00
- Label: ANTI-
- Producers: Jonathan Pierce, Bryan De Leon, and Sonny DiPerri

The Drums chronology
Abysmal Thoughts (2017)	Brutalism (2019)	Jonny (2023)

Singles from Brutalism
- 1. "Body Chemistry" Released: January 15, 2019; 2. "626 Bedford Avenue" Released: February 26, 2019; 3. "Loner" Released: April 2, 2019; 4. "Try" Released: June 26, 2019

Professional ratings
Aggregate scores
Source	Rating
AnyDecentMusic?	6.7/10
Metacritic	72/100
Review scores
Source	Rating
AllMusic	3.5/5 stars
DIY	3/5 stars
Exclaim!	8/10
NME	3/5 stars
Pitchfork	5.9/10
PopMatters	8/10 stars
Under the Radar	6/10 stars

Brutalism is the fifth studio album by New York City indie rock project the Drums. The album was released on April 5, 2019, through ANTI-. The album was preceded by the lead single "Body Chemistry".

== Track listing ==
No.	Title	Length
1.	"Pretty Cloud"	3:29
2.	"Body Chemistry"	4:48
3.	"626 Bedford Avenue"	3:22
4.	"Brutalism"	3:49
5.	"Loner"	3:47
6.	"I Wanna Go Back"	4:04
7.	"Kiss It Away"	3:41
8.	"Nervous"	4:05
9.	"Blip of Joy"	3:55
Total length:		35:00

Vinyl hidden track
No.	Title	Length
10.	"Try"	3:33

== Personnel ==
- Produced by Jonathan Pierce, Bryan De Leon, and Sonny DiPerri
- Engineered by Sonny DiPerri
- Mixed by Chis Coady at Sunset Sound
- Mix Asst by Matthew Neighbor
- Mastered by Emerson Mancini, Demifugue at Larrabee Sound Studios
