= Portamento (album) =

Studio album by the Drums
- Released: September 13, 2011
- Recorded: 2011
- Genres: Indie pop, new wave, post-punk revival
- Length: 45:17
- Label: Moshi Moshi / Island
- Producers: Jonathan Pierce, Jacob Graham, Connor Hanwick

The Drums chronology
The Drums (2010)	Portamento (2011)	Encyclopedia (2014)

Singles from Portamento
- 1. "Money" Released: August 19, 2011; 2. "How It Ended" Released: October 3, 2011; 3. "Days" Released: February 27, 2012

Portamento is the second studio album by American indie pop band the Drums. The album was released in the United Kingdom on September 2, 2011 through Moshi Moshi and Island Records and was preceded by the release of lead single "Money" on August 19, 2011.

== Reception ==
Professional ratings
Review scores
Source	Rating
The Guardian	2/5 stars
The Independent	2/5 stars
MusicOMH	4/5 stars
NME	7/10
The Observer	2/5 stars
The Phoenix	2.5/5 stars
Pitchfork	7.4/10
PopMatters	7/10 stars
Slant	4/5 stars
Spin	7/10 stars

Portamento received mixed reviews. Review aggregator Metacritic assigned an average critic score of 64 out of 100 based on 22 reviews. Helen Clarke of musicOMH gave the album four out of five stars, saying, "With their second album The Drums are more absorbing than ever, and have created a record that will last far longer than their first." Mike Williams of NME wrote, "With a little more self-censorship and less browbeating we'd be looking at one of the albums of the year," awarding the record 7/10.

== Singles ==
"Money" is the lead single taken from Portamento. The single was released as a digital download in the United Kingdom on September 4, 2011. "How It Ended" was the second single released in the UK on 3 October 2011. "Days" was the third single from the album released in the UK on February 27, 2012.

== Track listing ==
No.	Title	Writer(s)	Length
1.	"Book of Revelation"	Jonny Pierce	3:31
2.	"Days"	Pierce, Connor Hanwick	4:30
3.	"What You Were"	Pierce, Hanwick	3:16
4.	"Money"	Pierce, Hanwick	3:55
5.	"Hard to Love"	Pierce	3:54
6.	"I Don't Know How to Love"	Pierce, Hanwick, Jacob Graham	3:23
7.	"Searching for Heaven"	Pierce, Graham	2:50
8.	"Please Don't Leave"	Pierce	4:13
9.	"If He Likes It Let Him Do It"	Pierce, Graham	3:52
10.	"I Need a Doctor"	Pierce, Hanwick	4:17
11.	"In the Cold"	Pierce, Hanwick	3:30
12.	"How It Ended"	Pierce	4:19
Total length:			45:17

iTunes bonus tracks
No.	Title	Length
13.	"Blue Stripes" (Bonus Track)	4:07
14.	"What We Had" (Bonus Track)	3:52
15.	"Searching For Heaven" (Music Video)
16.	"Money" (Music Video)

== Personnel ==
- Jonathan Pierce – Vocals, Drums
- Jacob Graham – Synthesizer
- Connor Hanwick – Guitar
- Lee Hanwick - Saxophone on What You Were

== Charts ==
Chart (2011)	Peak position
Ireland (IRMA)	59
Spain (PME)	44
Switzerland (Swiss Albums Chart)	92
UK Albums (OCC)	44
US Top Heatseekers (Billboard)	10

== Release history ==
Region	Date	Format	Label
Ireland	September 2, 2011	Digital download	Island Records
United Kingdom	September 2, 2011	Digital download	Island Records
