= The Drums (album) =

Studio album by the Drums
- Released: June 7, 2010
- Recorded: New York
- Genres: Indie rock, indie pop, post-punk revival, new wave, surf rock
- Length: 43:15
- Label: Moshi Moshi/Island
- Producer: Jonathan Pierce

The Drums chronology
| Summertime! EP (2009) | The Drums (2010) | Portamento (2011) |

Singles from The Drums
- 1. "Best Friend" Released: March 28, 2010; 2. "Me and the Moon" Released: May 31, 2010; 3. "Let's Go Surfing (reissue)" Released: August 12, 2010; 4. "Forever and Ever, Amen" Released: December 12, 2010

The Drums is the debut studio album by American indie pop band the Drums. It was released June 7, 2010, on Moshi Moshi and Island Records. The album contains the singles "Let's Go Surfing," "Best Friend," "Me and the Moon" and "Forever and Ever, Amen" as well as "Down By The Water," which had previously been released as part of the band's Summertime! EP.

== Recording ==
The album was recorded in Jacob Graham's apartment in Florida, the band's apartment in New York City, and in a shack in Woodstock, New York.

== Reception ==
=== Critical reception ===
Professional ratings
Aggregate scores
| Source | Rating |
|---|---|
| AnyDecentMusic? | 7.0/10 |
| Metacritic | 73/100 |
Review scores
| Source | Rating |
| AllMusic | 4/5 stars |
| The Guardian | 3/5 stars |
| The Independent | 3/5 stars |
| Mojo | 4/5 stars |
| NME | 8/10 |
| Pitchfork | 7.5/10 |
| Q | 4/5 stars |
| Rolling Stone | 2.5/5 stars |
| Spin | 8/10 |
| The Times | 4/5 stars |

The album has had positive reviews. Jamie Fullerton of NME said, "The Drums have proved... there's still a hurricane of heartsore life in guitar pop." It also highlighted "Book of Stories," "Down by the Water" and "Skippin' Town" as particularly good tracks. BBC music critic Si Hawkins noted how the band utilizes influences from the Manchester music scene (Morrissey, Phil Spector, Peter Hook) for its tracks and encapsulate them through lyrics reminiscent of John Hughes films, saying they "skillfully conjure[s] a time long before credit crunches, when the most important thing in the world was your current squeeze." Q gave the album 4 stars, saying that "The Drums provide its steadiest beat in years" when referring to the album's impact on the indie music genre. Paul Neeson from The Skinny said of the record, "whilst at times as deep as the proverbial puddle is wildly infectious in its vivid sense of carpe diem," concluding that "They may well turn to vapour and disappear in the dawn of 2011; however, for now, as a guilty indulgence or otherwise, score your summer to the sound of The Drums."

Andy Gill of The Independent praised the band's new wave-inspired musicianship and Pierce's vocal performance but was wary of their "brittle artifice" and "disingenuous innocence" throughout the track listing, concluding that "they probably needn't worry about coming up with enough material for That Difficult Second Album; but next time, they might try polishing the songs a bit more." The Guardian's Dorian Lynskey admired the band for attempting to recapture the innocence of 80s indie music but criticized their musical charm for being spread thin and coming across as a formulaic imitation, concluding that "the Drums confuse sincerity with banality, and sweetness with sap, and end up recalling a less flattering label from alternative music's faltering adolescence: indie schmindie." Jon Dolan of Rolling Stone commended the band's concept of post-Ian Curtis New Order making Beach Boys songs, highlighting "Best Friend" for bringing "genuine gloom" to the proceedings, but felt "the forlorn-bubblegum formula feels vapid stretched over an album."

== Singles ==
- The first single to be released from the album was "Best Friend," which was released on March 29, 2010. The single found success in the UK, where it charted at number 110.
- The second single to be released from the album was "Me and the Moon," which was released on May 31, 2010. The single acted as the second promotion for the album, which was released a week later on June 7.
- The third single to be released from the album was "Let's Go Surfing," which was released on August 12, 2010. Having originally peaked at number 107 upon initial release in September 2009, the reissue lead to the single peaking at number 63 on the UK Singles Chart, marking the band's most successful single to date.
- The fourth single to be released from the album is "Forever and Ever, Amen," which was released on December 12, 2010.

== Track listing ==
All tracks are written by Jonny Pierce, except where noted.

| No. | Title | Length |
|---|---|---|
| 1. | "Best Friend" (Jonny Pierce, Jacob Graham) | 3:26 |
| 2. | "Me and the Moon" (Pierce, Graham) | 3:12 |
| 3. | "Let's Go Surfing" | 2:56 |
| 4. | "Book of Stories" | 3:38 |
| 5. | "Skippin' Town" | 3:22 |
| 6. | "Forever and Ever, Amen" (Pierce, Graham) | 4:24 |
| 7. | "Down by the Water" | 3:33 |
| 8. | "It Will All End in Tears" | 3:44 |
| 9. | "We Tried" | 3:45 |
| 10. | "I Need Fun in My Life" | 3:27 |
| 11. | "I'll Never Drop My Sword" | 3:43 |
| 12. | "The Future" (Pierce, Connor Hanwick) | 4:09 |

iTunes bonus tracks
| No. | Title | Length |
|---|---|---|
| 13. | "When I Come Home" (Bonus Track) | 3:41 |
| 14. | "Best Friend" (Music Video) | 3:33 |

== Personnel ==
Adapted credits from the media notes of The Drums.

The Drums

- Jonathan Pierce - vocals, guitar, bass, drums, percussion, synthesizer, keyboards
- Jacob Graham - guitar, synthesizer (tracks 1, 2)
- Connor Hanwick - guitar (track 12), drums*
- Adam Kessler - guitar*
- Note - although Kessler is credited as a guitarist, he does not perform on any of the recorded tracks. Hanwick is credited as a drummer but only contributes guitar on The Future

Production

- Geoff Pesche - mastering (Abbey Road)

Artwork

- Alex Lake - cover photo
- Adam Kessler - woodworking
- Kevin Tachman - band photo
- Seth Kirby - lighting
- Jacob Graham - all artwork

Management

- 3D Management

== Charts ==
| Chart (2011) | Peak position |
|---|---|
| Ireland (IRMA) | 29 |
| Belgium (Ultratop) | 44 |
| Norway (Norwegian Albums Chart) | 30 |
| France (French Albums Chart) | 100 |
| UK (The Official Charts Company) | 19 |
| US (Billboard Top Heatseekers) | 17 |

== Certifications ==
| Region | Certification | Certified units/sales |
|---|---|---|
| United Kingdom (BPI) | Gold | 100,000^{‡} |
^{‡} Sales+streaming figures based on certification alone.
