= Summertime! =

EP by The Drums
- Released: October 12, 2009
- Genre: Indie pop, post-punk revival
- Length: 25:03
- Label: Moshi Moshi

The Drums chronology
| Summertime! (2009) | The Drums (2010) |

Singles from Summertime!
- 1. "Let's Go Surfing / Don't Be a Jerk, Johnny" Released: 15 September 2009; 2. "I Felt Stupid / Down by the Water" Released: 30 November 2010

Summertime! is the first EP by the American indie pop band the Drums, released in 2009 by the Moshi Moshi record label.

Two of the tracks from the EP, "Let's Go Surfing" and "Down by the Water" later appeared on the band's first album, The Drums, released in 2010.

== Track listing ==
| No. | Title | Length |
|---|---|---|
| 1. | "Let's Go Surfing" | 2:56 |
| 2. | "Make You Mine" | 3:22 |
| 3. | "Don't Be a Jerk, Johnny" | 4:06 |
| 4. | "Submarine" | 3:55 |
| 5. | "Down by the Water" | 3:27 |
| 6. | "Saddest Summer" | 3:26 |
| 7. | "I Felt Stupid" | 3:53 |

== Personnel ==
- Jonathan Pierce - vocals, bass
- Jacob Graham - guitar
- Adam Kessler - guitar
- Connor Hanwick - drums
