= The Drums =

American indie pop band

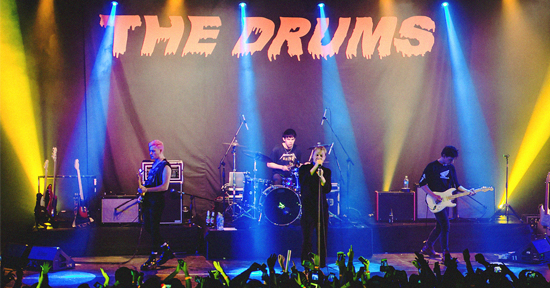
- The Drums, Abysmal Thoughts tour 2018

Background information
- Origin: Brooklyn, New York, U.S.
- Genres: Indie pop; surf rock; alternative rock; jangle pop; indie rock; post punk revival
- Years active: 2008–present
- Labels: Frenchkiss; Island; ANTI-; Abysmal Records
- Members: Jonathan Pierce
- Past members: Jacob Graham; Connor Hanwick; Adam Kessler
- Website: thedrums.com

The Drums is an American indie pop band/project from New York City. It was initially formed by Jonathan Pierce and Jacob Graham as Goat Explosion, and later added Adam Kessler and Connor Hanwick. Graham exited the band in 2016. Since then, the band has operated as a solo project of sole remaining member Jonathan Pierce.

== Formation ==
Founding members Jonathan (Jonny) Pierce and Jacob Graham became friends as children, having met at Bible camp. Some years later, they formed a short-lived electro-pop group initially named Goat Explosion, eventually renamed Elkland. They released one album, Golden, in 2005 and garnered interest with the single "Apart".

In 2008, Pierce and Graham came up with the concept for The Drums, and Pierce moved to Kissimmee, Florida, where Graham resided at the time, so that they could more readily collaborate. They then moved to Brooklyn, in the spring of 2009, where drummer Connor Hanwick and former Elkland guitarist Adam Kessler joined the band to complete their live sound. The band had their first gig within a week of arriving in Brooklyn at Cake Shop NYC as part of the NYC Pop Fest. In October 2009, the band released their first EP, Summertime!.

== Career ==
In December 2009, the band was shortlisted as one of the 15 music acts for the BBC Sound of 2010. Subsequently, they placed at No. 5 in this list on 4 January 2010. In NME's first issue of 2010 they were named number 1 in the magazine's top tips for the year as well as in Clash Magazine's Tips for 2010. The Drums were also voted "Best Hope for 2010" in Pitchfork's 2009 Readers' Poll. They won the Hall Radar Award for 2010 and were the most Shazamed band of 2009.

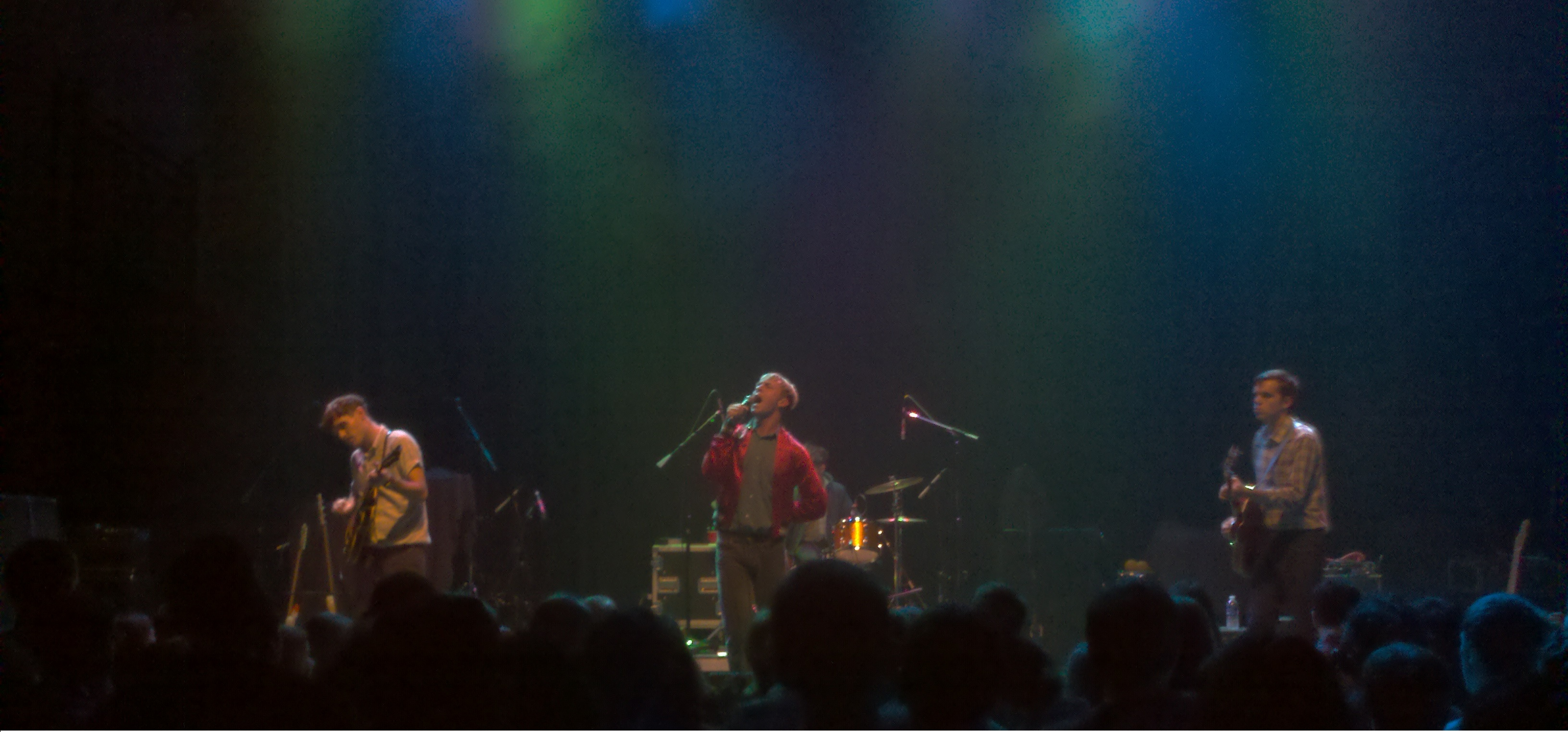
The Drums performing at the 9:30 Club in 2010

In February 2010, the band played venues around the UK on the 2010 NME Awards Tour alongside the Maccabees, Bombay Bicycle Club and the Big Pink, going on to play support band for Florence and the Machine's 2010 Cosmic Love tour. In June 2010 they played as one of the support bands for Kings of Leon in Hyde Park, London.

On May 7, 2010, they appeared on Friday Night with Jonathan Ross, where they performed "Best Friend". Their debut album was officially released on June 7, 2010, on Moshi Moshi and Island Records. The album contained the singles "Let's Go Surfing", "Best Friend," "Me and the Moon" and "Forever and Ever, Amen" as well as "Down By The Water", which had previously been released as part of the band's Summertime! EP. On September 16, 2010, it was announced on the band's Facebook page and website that guitarist Adam Kessler had left the band.

The Drums released the single "The New World" on April 11, 2011, with proceeds going to Japan disaster relief efforts.

For their second LP, the band recorded quickly, again self-producing, often laying down tracks spontaneously in singer Jonny Pierce’s kitchen. They released Portamento on September 5, 2011. The album title has a deeper meaning for Pierce, as he describes, “Jacob and I meeting as young boys with a shared love for Kraftwerk and Anything Box and Wendy Carlos, and these were all synth pioneers, and a common feature on old analogue systems was ‘Portamento’.

After Portamento's world tour ended in late 2012, founding member Connor Hanwick left the group.

In November 2012, Jonny Pierce announced he would be releasing a solo album in 2013. The Drums continued on with members Jonny Pierce and Jacob Graham.

The Drums made their American television debut on Late Night With Jimmy Fallon on February 15, 2012. MTV gave the band a celebrity chart special on MTV HD channel in May 2012, where Pierce and Graham introduced their favorite videos and bands as well as some of their own videos.

On July 17, 2014, The Drums announced that their third studio album would be called Encyclopedia and would be released September 23, 2014. In an interview with Billboard Magazine, they stated that he and Graham were ready to come back together and give The Drums another try. They holed up in a lakeside cabin in upstate New York and "went crazy", says Graham. "That's when it occurred to me that we can have fun with this and make a record that's interesting and bizarre.' "The resulting cathartic collection of tracks departs from the Drums' signature "tonal palette," as Graham calls it. With taut, spindly guitar lines, liberal sprinklings of tambourine, and uptempo kick drums that belie the brooding, thoughtful content matter of songs like "Best Friend".

On August 20, 2014, they released the single "I Can't Pretend". Their Third studio album Encyclopedia (album) released on spetmeber 23, 2014, through Norman Records.

On March 1, 2017, they released the debut single, "Blood Under My Belt," from their 2017 album Abysmal Thoughts. It was announced via a Facebook post in which frontman Jonny Pierce took full credit for the writing and producing of the album. Longstanding member Jacob Graham later announced on Instagram that he had left The Drums. In his statement, he said, "It's actually been over a year now since I left the band but it's just now coming to light with today's press. There are no hard feelings whatsoever, I wish Jonny and the band the best of luck. I'd been with the band for almost ten years and I wanted to focus on my puppetry and my work with my new band Sound of Ceres." Their fourth album was released on June 16 on ANTI-.

On April 5, 2019, The Drums released their fifth album, Brutalism.

On December 11, 2020 The Drums released a 3 track titled "Ambulance" with Jonny Pierce appearing as a single artist.

On April 3, 2023, The Drums released their first single in years, "I Want It All", as well as announced a U.S. summer tour. Pierce says of the single: "The song emerged from the longing and the pain that stemmed from a loveless childhood. It is only in the past few years that I have really begun to understand what happened to me as a boy, which has helped me to start to build my own bridge toward real love." On May 11, Pierce shared two more singles, "Plastic Envelope" and "Protect Him Always".

In 2024, one of the singers is the guest star from the children's television in Yo Gabba Gabbaland and perform the song, "Ch-Ch-Change".

On July 31, 2026, The Drums released their first single in two years, "It Didn't Matter". The song featured production and writing from the artist Mareux. Jonathan Pierce announced he started his own record label, Abysmal Records, and left Anti-records. On August 28, 2026 Pierce shared a second single "Yes&No" featuring Ledbyher. On September 18 the single "Isolation" was realeased featuring indie post-punk project 60 Juno. On October 16 another single was issued called "Blackstar", featuring genesis Owusu.

== Influences ==
The band have cited influences including Kraftwerk, OMD, the Smiths, Orange Juice, the Wake, the Legends, the Shangri-Las, the Tough Alliance, the Embassy, and Joy Division. Graham also mentions that reverb in general has played a major role in their sound: "...If reverb didn't exist we wouldn't have bothered trying to start a band."

== Solo projects ==
In 2011, Jonny Pierce co-wrote "In the Middle (I Met You There)" with Brooklyn artist Matthew Dear for his EP Headcage. His writing credits also include "You Gave Me Nothing" and "Lose It (In the End)" which are included on Mark Ronson's album Record Collection.

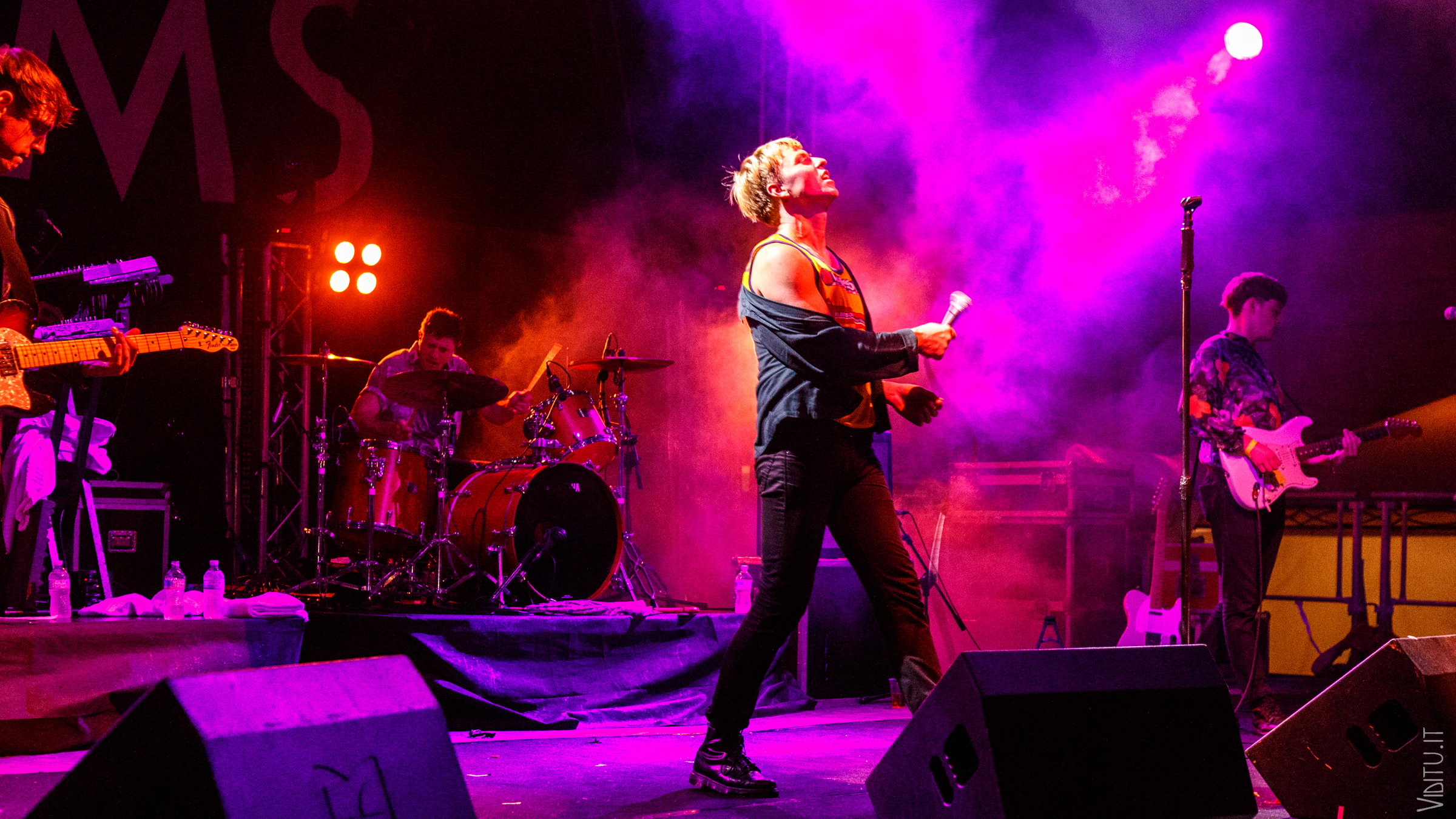
The Drums performing at YpsigRock in 2013

Both members of The Drums have announced solo records in the works for release in 2013. Jonathan under the name Jonny Pierce, and Jacob as Cascading Slopes. In December, Pierce said in an interview with NME "I wanted to be as self-indulgent as possible with this album. This is pop done the way I think it should be done." The album was never completed however. Instead, Jonny Pierce announced that The Drums had entered the studio and wanted to release a Drums record instead. Cascading Slopes completed the album Towards a Quaker View of Synthesizers in 2013 and it was released in the fall through Plastiq Musiq. Graham described the musical approach on that album, saying "The concept is to write very simple, personal, folk songs but to do it with only old, analog synthesizers".

== Band members ==
Current members

- Jonathan Pierce – lead vocals, guitar, keyboards, synthesizers (2008–present) bass, drums (2010–present)

Current touring musicians

- Johnny Aries – guitar, bass (2012–present)
- Frank Corr – guitar (2023–present)
- Oscar Henfrey – drums (2024–present)

Former members

- Adam Kessler – bass, guitar (2008–2010)
- Connor Hanwick – drums, percussion (2008–2011), guitar (2011; touring musician 2011–2012, 2016)
- Jacob Graham – guitar, synthesizer (2008–2016)

Former touring musicians

- Chris Stein – drums (2011)
- Myles Matheny – bass, guitar, backing vocals (2011–2012)
- Connor Hanwick – guitar (2011–2012, 2016)
- Danny Lee Allen – drums (2011–2017)
- Charles Russell Narwold – guitar, bass (2012–2013)
- Rene Perez – guitar (2014–2016)
- Randy Delgado – percussion (2012–2013)
- Alex Feldman – drums (2017)
- Tom Haslow – guitar, bass (2010, 2014, 2017–2020)
- Bryan de Leon – drums (2017–2022)
- Waylon Dean – guitar (2021–2022)
- Gavin McDonald – drums (2023–2024)

Timeline

== Discography ==
- Summertime! (2009)
- The Drums (2010)
- Portamento (2011)
- Encyclopedia (2014)
- Abysmal Thoughts (2017)
- Brutalism (2019)
- Jonny (2023)

== Awards and nominations ==
2016: Berlin Music Video Awards, nominated in the Best Narrative category for 'THERE IS NOTHING LEFT'
