= Dragon (zodiac) =

Chinese zodiac sign

- "Dragon" in traditional (top) and simplified (bottom) Chinese characters
- Traditional Chinese: 龍
- Simplified Chinese: 龙
Transcriptions
Standard Mandarin
- Hanyu Pinyin: lóng
- Gwoyeu Romatzyh: long
- Wade–Giles: lung^{2}
- IPA: [lʊ̌ŋ]
Hakka
- Romanization: liùng
Yue: Cantonese
- Yale Romanization: lùhng
- Jyutping: lung4
- IPA: [lʊŋ˩]
Southern Min
- Hokkien POJ: lêng
Eastern Min
- Fuzhou BUC: lṳ̀ng
Northern Min
- Jian'ou Romanized: lê̤ng
Old Chinese
- Baxter (1992): *C-rjong
- Baxter–Sagart (2014): *mə-roŋ

Zodiac dragon

The Dragon (simplified Chinese: 龙; traditional Chinese: 龍; pinyin: lóng; Jyutping: lung4; Cantonese Yale: lùhng) is the fifth of the 12-year cycle of animals that appear in the Chinese zodiac related to the Chinese calendar. The Year of the Dragon is associated with the Earthly Branch symbol 辰 (pinyin: chén).

It has been proposed that the Earthly Branch character may have been associated with scorpions; it may have symbolized the star Antares. In the Buddhist calendar used in Thailand, Cambodia, Laos, Myanmar, and Sri Lanka, the dragon is replaced by the nāga. In the Gurung zodiac, the dragon is replaced by the eagle. In the Old Turkic calendar it is replaced by a fish or crocodile. Early Persian translations of the medieval period change the dragon to a sea serpent, although in current times it is generally referred to as a whale.

During China's Cultural Revolution, there was an attempt to replace the dragon with the giant panda; however, the movement was short lived.

== Years and the five elements ==
People born within these date ranges can be said to have been born in the Year of the Dragon, while bearing the following elemental signs:

Start date	End date	Heavenly branch
23 January 1928	9 February 1929	Earth Dragon
8 February 1940	26 January 1941	Metal Dragon
27 January 1952	13 February 1953	Water Dragon
13 February 1964	1 February 1965	Wood Dragon
31 January 1976	17 February 1977	Fire Dragon
17 February 1988	5 February 1989	Earth Dragon
5 February 2000	23 January 2001	Metal Dragon
23 January 2012	9 February 2013	Water Dragon
10 February 2024	28 January 2025	Wood Dragon
28 January 2036	14 February 2037	Fire Dragon
14 February 2048	1 February 2049	Earth Dragon
2 February 2060	20 January 2061	Metal Dragon
19 February 2072	6 February 2073	Water Dragon
6 February 2084	25 January 2085	Wood Dragon
25 January 2096	11 February 2097	Fire Dragon

There are typically marked spikes in the birth rates of countries that use the Chinese zodiac or places with substantial Chinese populations during the Year of the Dragon, because these births are considered to be lucky and have desirable characteristics that supposedly lead to better life outcomes. The relatively recent phenomenon of planning a child's birth in a Year of the Dragon has led to hospital capacity issues and even an uptick in infant mortality rates toward the end of these years due to strained neonatal resources.

== Compatibility ==
Sign	Best match or balance (first trine group)	Match	Non-match or rival (opposite sign)
Dragon	Rooster, Rat	Monkey, Ox, Pig, Horse, Rabbit	Dog, Goat

Cycle (trine group): Dragon needs Monkey, Monkey needs Rat, Rat needs Dragon; It is opposed to or rivals the Dog.

== Basic astrology elements ==
Earthly Branches	Chen
Five elements	Wood
Yin yang	Yang
Lunar month	6 April to 6 May
Lucky numbers	1, 6, and 7; avoid 2, 8, and 9
Lucky flowers	Hyacinths
Lucky colors	Gold, green, blue; avoid red
Season	Spring
Time of day	7 A.M. - 9 A.M.
Lucky/Associated Countries:	China, United Kingdom, Iraq, Italy, Denmark
