= Bryer (surname) =

Bryer is a surname, and may refer to:

- Anthony Bryer (1937–2016), British historian
- Constance Bryer (1870–1952), British violinist and suffragette
- Cornelis de Bryer (fl. 1650s), Flemish painter
- Dan Bryer (born 1989), English musical artist
- Denise Bryer (1928–2021), British actress
- Henia Bryer (born 1925), South African Holocaust survivor
- Lionel Bryer (1928–2006), British philanthropist
- Louisa Jane Bryer (1867–1958), English missionary
- Paul Bryer (1958–2023), British Anglican priest
- Scott Bryer, American politician
- Tania Bryer (born 1962), British broadcaster

== See also ==
- Brier (surname)
