= Kompyang =

Chinese-origin circular bread

Kompia
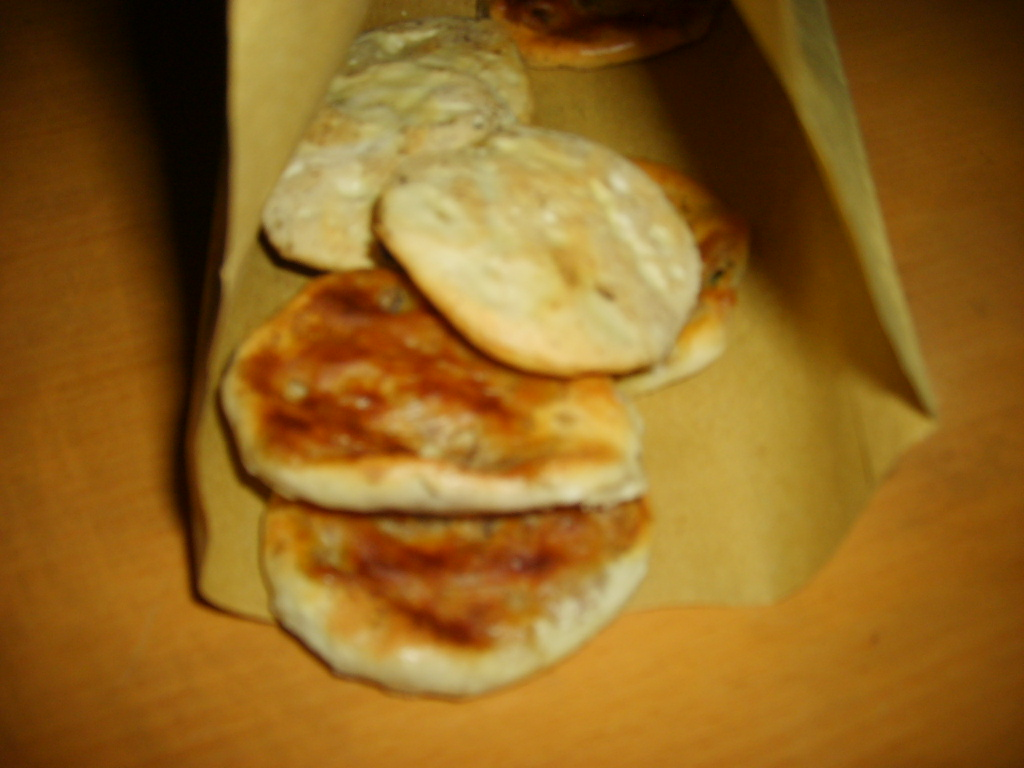
- A kompia from Jian'ou in China's Fujian Province
- Alternative names: Kompyang
- Type: Bread
- Place of origin: Fuzhou, Fujian
- Region or state: Fujian, Sarawak, Perak, Matsu, Ryukyus
- Main ingredients: Flour, lard, onions, salt

Kompyang

Chinese name
- Traditional Chinese: 光餅
- Simplified Chinese: 光饼
Transcriptions
Standard Mandarin
- Hanyu Pinyin: guāngbǐng
Yue: Cantonese
- Yale Romanization: gwōngbéng
Eastern Min
- Fuzhou BUC: guŏng-biāng
Pu-Xian Min
- Hinghwa BUC: gng-biâⁿ
Northern Min
- Jian'ou Romanized: guáng-biǎng

Min name
- Chinese: 鹹光餅
Transcriptions
Southern Min
- Hokkien POJ: kiâm-kong-piáⁿ

Malay name
- Malay: kompia / roti kompyang

Indonesian name
- Indonesian: kompia / kompyang

Okinawan name
- Okinawan: 光餅 コンペン / クンペン konpen / kunpen

Kompia or kompyang, also known as guang bing, is a bread product that originates from Fuzhou, the capital city of Fujian Province of China as well as Fuqing. It is popular in Fujian and has spread to other areas including the Ryukyus, Taiwan, and parts of Southeast Asia including Indonesia and the Malaysian towns of Sitiawan, Sibu, Ayer Tawar, Sarikei, Bintangor and other places where the dominant Chinese community is of Fuzhou (alternatively romanized as "Foochow") and Fuqing ancestry (where it is sometimes nicknamed "Foochow bagels").

== History ==
Kompia was named after Qi Jiguang, who invented it. When Qi Jiguang led his troops into Fujian in 1563, the Japanese pirates, fearing his name, engaged mainly in guerrilla-style battles. Qi Jiguang noticed that the Japanese pirates could always trace where his troops camped because of the smoke that rose up to the sky when the soldiers prepared their meals. He found out the Japanese pirates had no such problem because they brought onigiri with them. So Qi Jiguang invented a kind of bread with a hole in the center so that they could be strung together to be conveniently carried along. Later, to commemorate Qi Jiguang's victory against the pirate raiders, the bread was named after him as guāng-bǐng (or "Guang cake").

== Ingredients ==
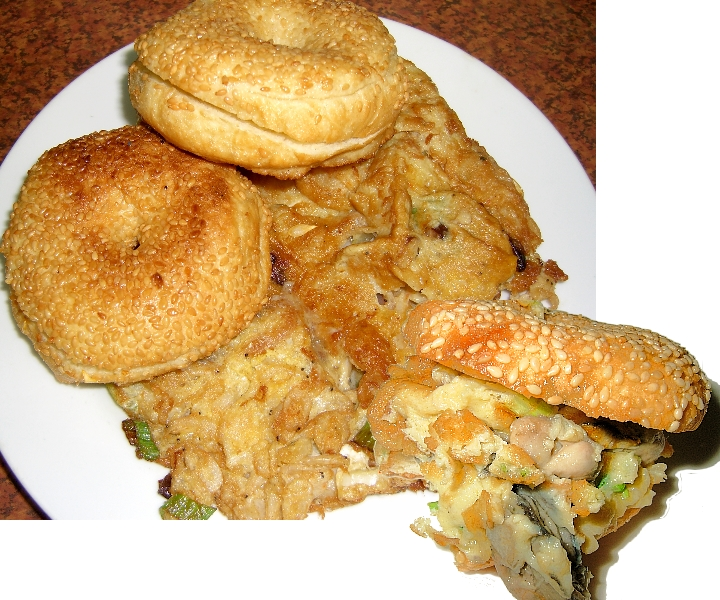
A kompia of Taiwan's Matsu Islands

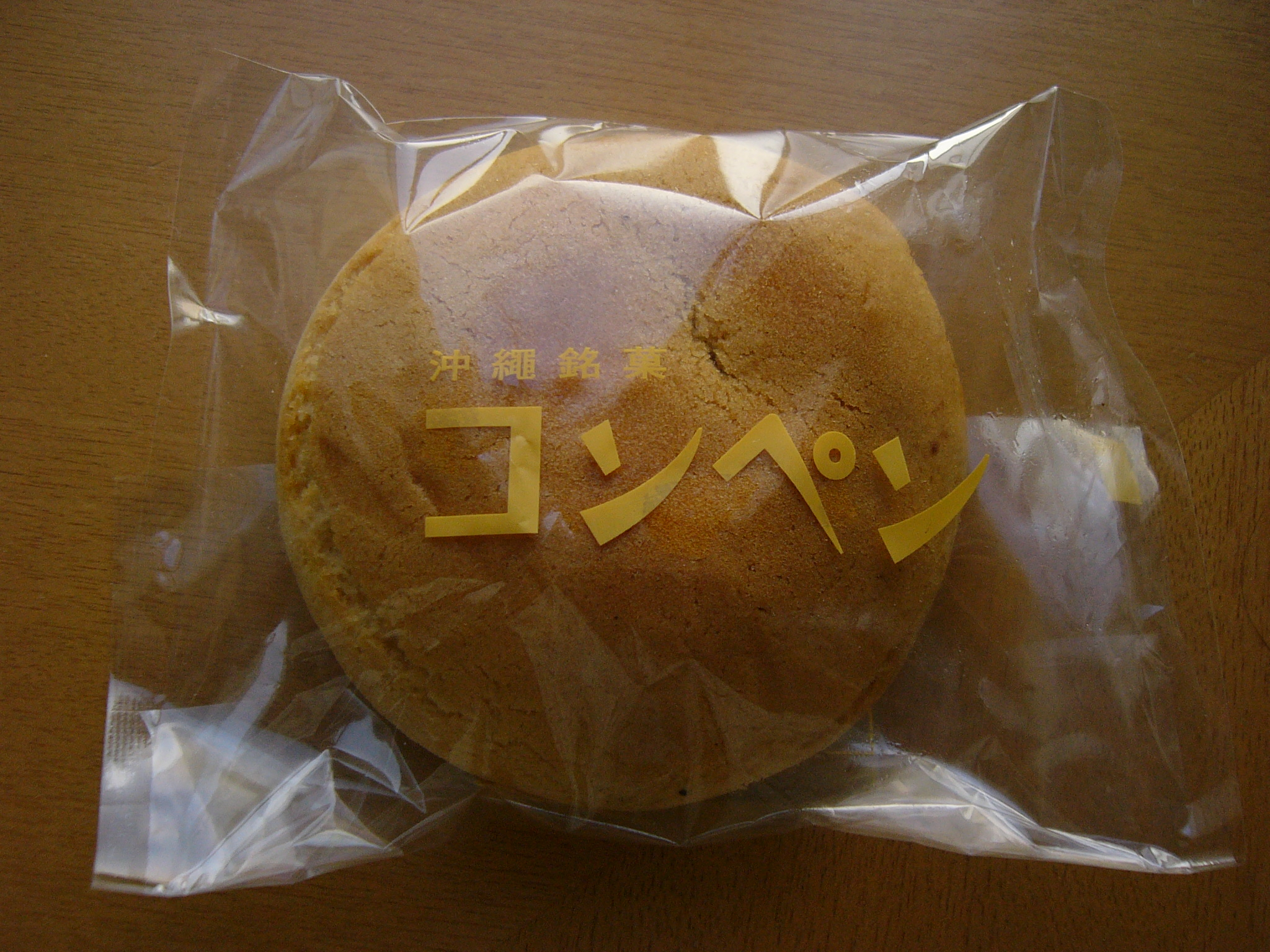
An Okinawan kompen

Kompia is made with lard, onions, salt and flour. A ball of flour is stuffed with a filling of other desired ingredients and flattened with a rolling pin. It is then slapped onto the sides of a traditional home-made Chinese oven and takes approximately 15 minutes to bake. Meat is often used as a filling in the bread.

== Variants ==
A variant with sesame seeds scattered on top and baked without any filling is known as 麻饼. A sweet variant known as 征东饼 (literally "Conquest of the East cake") uses a proportion of sugar to substitute the salt in the dough.
