= Bryar =

Bryar is a surname. Notable people with the surname include:

- Bob Bryar (1979-2024), American musician and sound engineer
- Claudia Bryar (1918–2011), American actress, wife of Paul
- Dick Bryar (1925–1968), Australian rules footballer
- Paul Bryar (1910–1985), American actor

== See also ==
- Breyer (disambiguation)
- Bryer (disambiguation)
- Bryan (surname)
