= Bryer =

Bryer may refer to:

- Bryer (surname)
- English ship Bryer

== People with the given name ==
- Bryer Schmegelsky (died 2019), Canadian fugitive

== See also ==
- Bryar (disambiguation)
- Breyer (disambiguation)
- Bryers
- Bryerson (disambiguation)
