= Brehaut =

Brehaut is a surname derived from the French Bréhaut, and ultimately of Germanic origin.

== Prevalence ==
The region of highest relative prevalence (density) is Guernsey, in the Channel Islands but is not believed to be derived from the French Bréhaut. The countries with the highest absolute prevalence are France, Canada, the United States, Australia and England.

== Variants ==
Variants include Berhaut, Brehat, Brehart, Brehault, Breheret, Brehier, and Burhoe.

== Notable people ==
Notable people with this surname include:

- Ashley Brehaut, Australian badminton player
- Greg Brehaut, Australian football player
- Jeff Brehaut, American golfer
- Pierre Brehaut, Canadian businessman
- Richard Brehaut, American American football player
- Stanley Bréhaut Ryerson, Canadian historian
- Stuart Brehaut, Australian badminton player
