= Monkey (zodiac) =

Sign of the Chinese zodiac

- "Monkey" in regular Chinese characters
- Chinese: 猴
Transcriptions
Standard Mandarin
- Hanyu Pinyin: hóu
- Wade–Giles: hou^{2}
- IPA: [xǒʊ]
Hakka
- Romanization: hèu
Yue: Cantonese
- Yale Romanization: hàuh
- Jyutping: hau4
- IPA: [hɐw˩]
Southern Min
- Hokkien POJ: hiô / hô͘ / kâu
Eastern Min
- Fuzhou BUC: hèu / gàu
Northern Min
- Jian'ou Romanized: gě
Old Chinese
- Baxter–Sagart (2014): *mə-ɡˤ(r)o

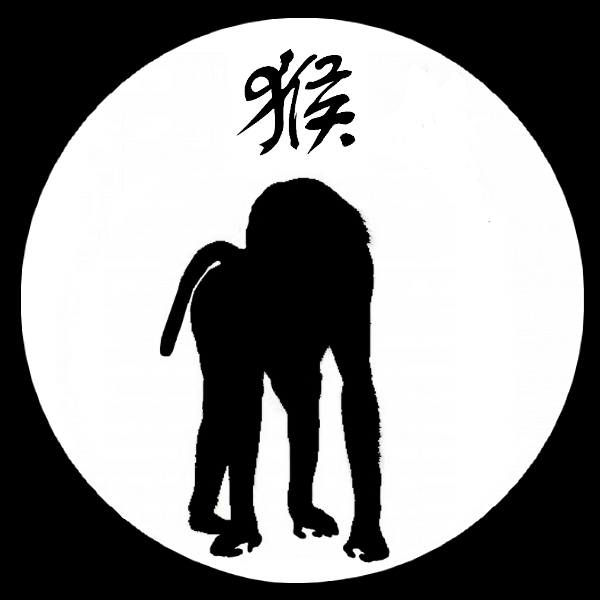
Zodiac monkey, showing the hóu (猴) character for monkey

The Monkey (猴) is the ninth animal in the 12-year cycle of Chinese zodiac, which is part of the traditional Chinese calendar. The Year of the Monkey is associated with the Earthly Branch symbol 申.

== Years and the five elements ==
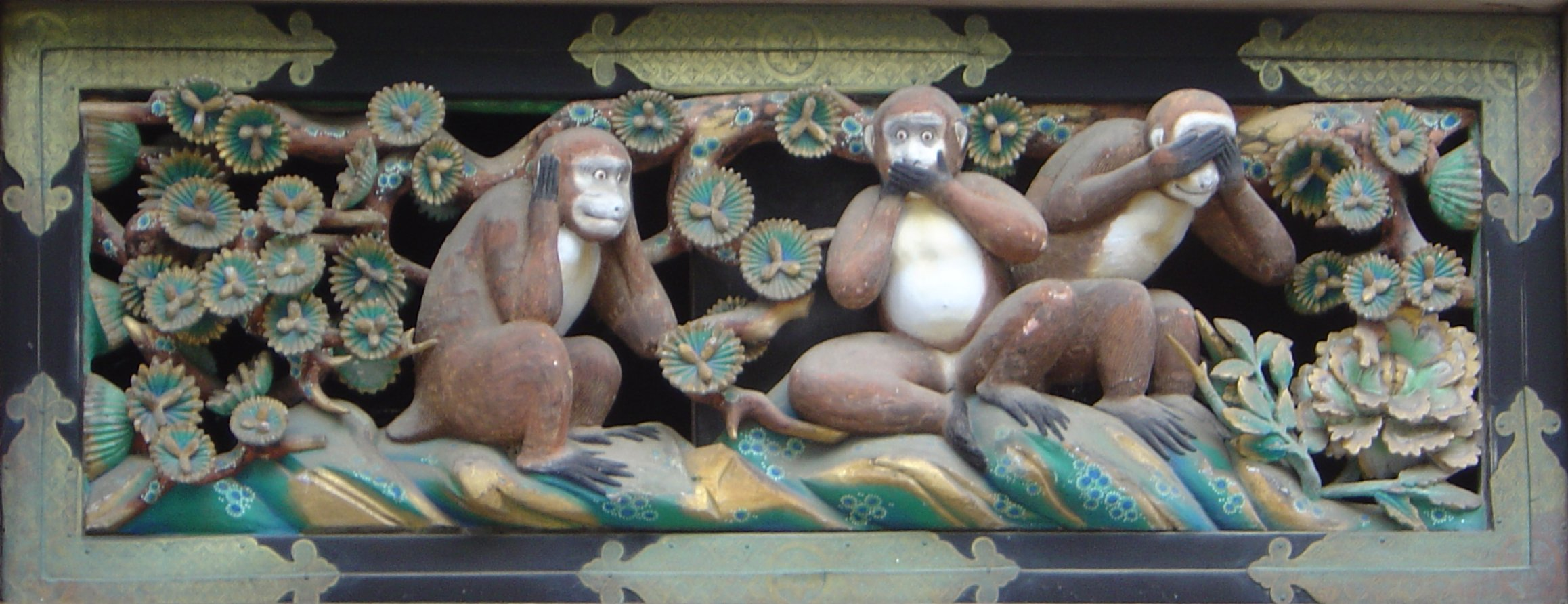
The three wise monkeys over the Tōshō-gū shrine in Nikkō, Japan

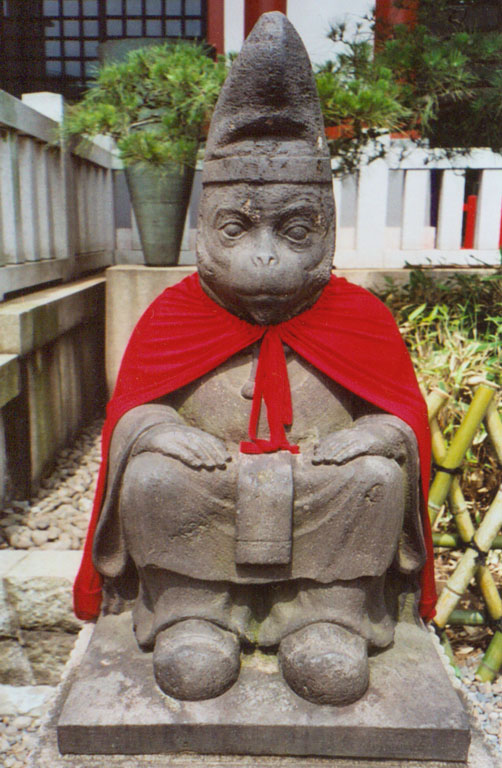
The monkey statue at the Shinto shrine in Tokyo

People born within these date ranges can be said to have been born in the "year of the monkey", while bearing the following elemental sign:

| Start date | End date | Heavenly branch |
|---|---|---|
| 6 February 1932 | 25 January 1933 | Water Monkey |
| 25 January 1944 | 12 February 1945 | Wood Monkey |
| 12 February 1956 | 30 January 1957 | Fire Monkey |
| 30 January 1968 | 16 February 1969 | Earth Monkey |
| 16 February 1980 | 4 February 1981 | Metal Monkey |
| 4 February 1992 | 22 January 1993 | Water Monkey |
| 22 January 2004 | 8 February 2005 | Wood Monkey |
| 8 February 2016 | 27 January 2017 | Fire Monkey |
| 26 January 2028 | 12 February 2029 | Earth Monkey |
| 12 February 2040 | 31 January 2041 | Metal Monkey |
| 1 February 2052 | 18 February 2053 | Water Monkey |
| 17 February 2064 | 4 February 2065 | Wood Monkey |
| 5 February 2076 | 23 January 2077 | Fire Monkey |
| 24 January 2088 | 9 February 2089 | Earth Monkey |
| 9 February 2100 | 28 January 2101 | Metal Monkey |

== Basic astrology elements ==
| Earthly Branches: | Shen |
| The Five Elements: | Metal |
| Yin Yang: | Yang |
| Lunar Month: | August 6 to September 5 |
| Earthly Branch Ruling Hours: | 3 p.m. to 5 p.m. |
| Lucky Numbers: | 1, 3, 4, 7, 8; Avoid: 2, 5, 9 |
| Lucky Colors: | violet, royal blue, ultramarine, blue, white, and gold; Avoid: red, black, grey |
| Season: | Summer |
| Lucky/Associated Countries: | United States, France, Norway, Azerbaijan, Indonesia, Tunisia |

== See also ==
- Monkey
