= Bryers =

Bryers is a surname. Notable people with this surname include:

- Duane Bryers (1911–2012), American artist and sculptor
- Paul Bryers (born 1955), British film director, screenwriter, and author
- Rhonda Bryers (1952–2007), New Zealand singer of Maori descent

== See also ==
- Breyers
- Bryer
