= European Union Youth Orchestra =

Youth orchestra of the European Union

- Youth orchestra
- Founded: 1976
- Location: Grafenegg, Austria
- Principal conductor: Iván Fischer
- Website: www.euyo.eu

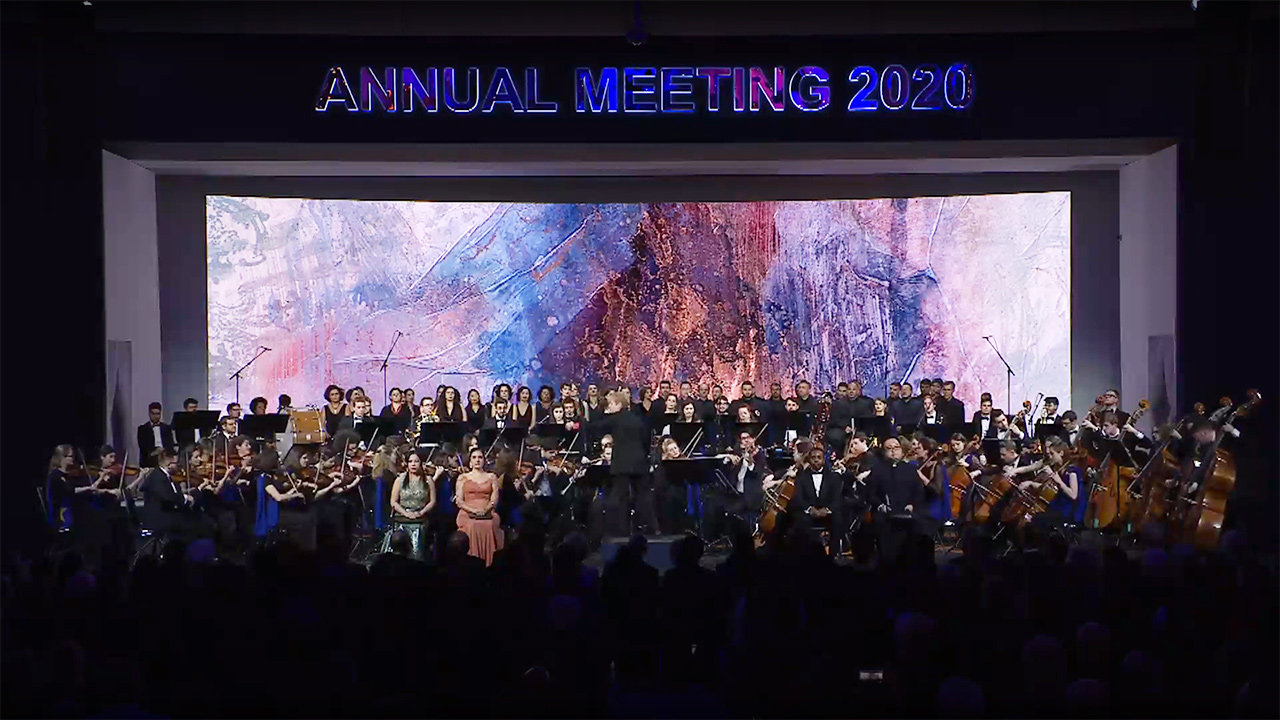
EUYO performing with Marin Alsop at the opening concert of the 2020 World Economic Forum in Davos

The European Union Youth Orchestra (EUYO) is a youth orchestra with members drawn from the 27 members states of the European Union. Since its foundation in 1976, it has connected music colleges and the professional music world for generations of European musicians. EUYO is considered one of the best youth orchestras in the world, achieving "extraordinarily high standards" and playing at all major European festivals, including the Proms, the Salzburg Festival, and Young Euro Classic.

EUYO is an associated member of the European Federation of National Youth Orchestras and is supported by the Creative Europe programme.

== Activities ==
External videos
- Performances of the European Union Youth Orchestra, conducted by Vasily Petrenko
- Mahler – Symphony No. 5
- Beethoven – Symphony No. 9
- Sibelius – Symphony No. 1

EUYO is open to all EU citizens between the ages of 16 and 26 for audition. Each year, it recruits around 120 members and 120 reserves from around 2,000 to 3,000 auditionees. Members spend 2–3 years in the orchestra on average, and over 90% of its former members have become professional musicians.

EUYO organizes spring and summer residencies every year, each followed by a tour. The spring residency begins with a 2–3 week residency at the orchestra's base in Ferrara. The summer residencies are based in Grafenegg and Bolzano and begin with a 3-week rehearsal period.

== History ==
EUYO was founded by Joy and Lionel Bryer in 1976 as the European Community Youth Orchestra (ECYO), following a resolution adopted by the European Parliament. Claudio Abbado served as the orchestra's founding director.

In 1994, the orchestra was renamed European Union Youth Orchestra (EUYO), following the Maastricht Treaty that established the European Union. By 2013, the orchestra had performed in every country of the European Union.

In 2014, EUYO launched the Towards 2020 (T2020) project, aiming to change the face of classical music in Europe by training young musicians to engage with 21st century audiences.

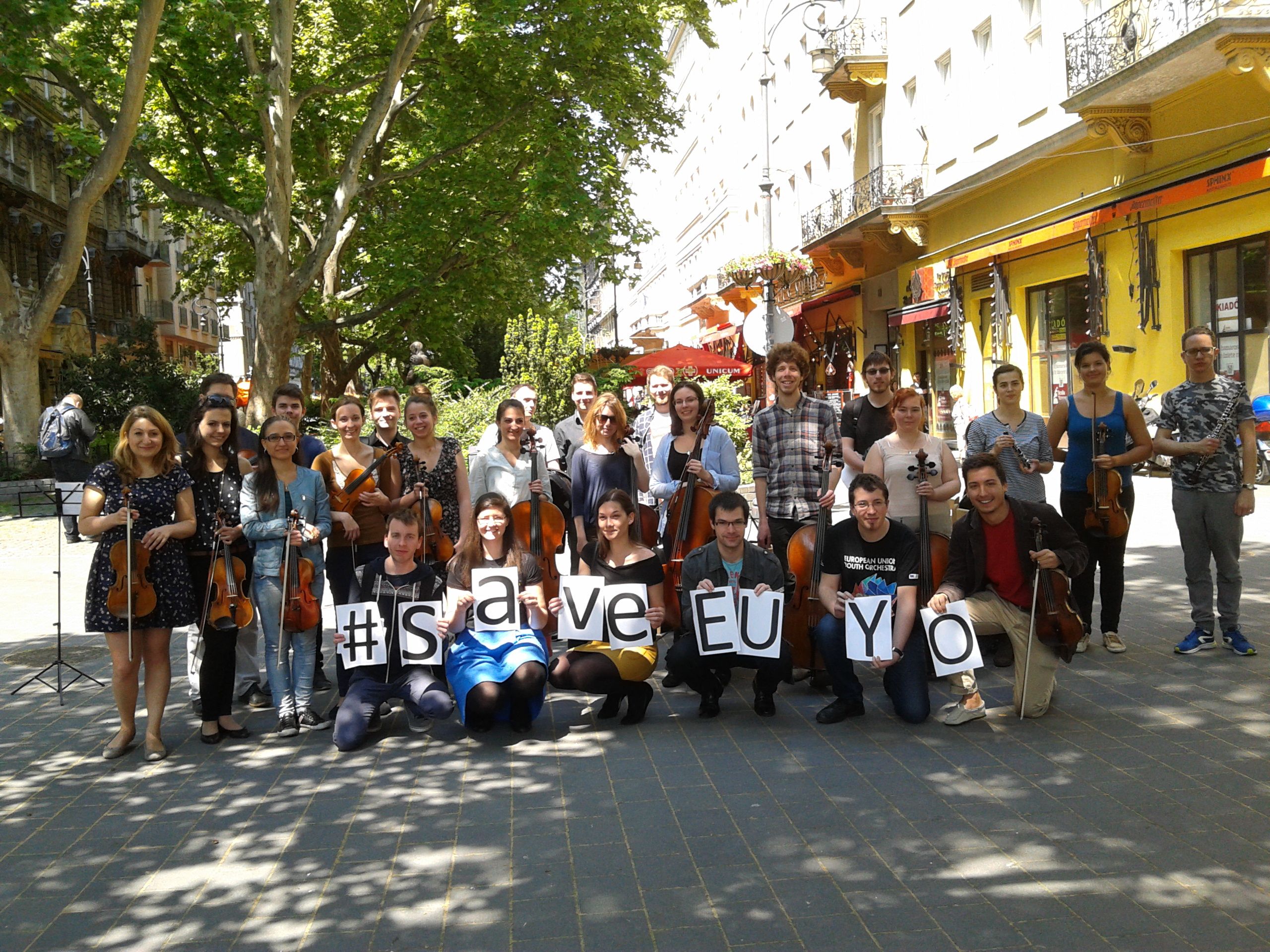
SaveEUYO flashmob in Budapest, May 2016

On 12 May 2016, EUYO announced that was to cease operations from September 2016 due to a lack of future funding from the European Union. However, the news attracted extensive support around Europe, where campaigns and flash mobs took place and many conductors and artists including Antonio Pappano, Gustavo Dudamel and Daniel Barenboim put their names to a statement supporting the orchestra's work. On 31 May 2016, an official press announcement from the Council of Ministers and European Commission confirmed that Commission President Jean-Claude Juncker had ordered three commissioners to find funding for EUYO. On 1 June 2016, Juncker announced a proposal to enable the European Union to return EUYO to core funding.

=== Relocation to Italy ===
The orchestra announced in October 2017 that, as a result of Brexit, it intended to relocate from London to Italy. Since the expiration of the Brexit transition period on 31 December 2020, members from the United Kingdom are no longer eligible to apply.

In 2018, EUYO relocated to Ferrara, Italy. The orchestra's headquarters were then housed in the Teatro Comunale Claudio Abbado, an opera house located in the heart of the city.

=== Relocation to Austria ===
On 5 December 2022, the orchestra announced that it would move its administrative home to Grafenegg and Vienna, Austria, from the beginning of 2023.

== Conductors ==
Since the orchestra's inception, there have been five principal conductors:

- Claudio Abbado (1976–1994)
- Bernard Haitink (1994–2000)
- Vladimir Ashkenazy (2000–2015)
- Vasily Petrenko (2015–2024)
- Iván Fischer (2024–present)

Assistant conductors have included James Judd.

EUYO has also worked with guest conductors including Daniel Barenboim, Leonard Bernstein, Herbert Blomstedt, James Conlon, Colin Davis, Antal Doráti, Carlo Maria Giulini, Herbert von Karajan, Rafael Kubelík, Erich Leinsdorf, Lorin Maazel, Zubin Mehta, Gianandrea Noseda, Kurt Sanderling, Gennady Rozhdestvensky, Mstislav Rostropovich and Georg Solti.

== Soloists ==
Soloists that have appeared with EUYO include pianists Martha Argerich, Vladimir Ashkenazy, Emanuel Ax, Evgeny Kissin, Radu Lupu, Julian Lloyd Webber, Murray Perahia, Maria João Pires, Mikhail Pletnev, Maurizio Pollini, violinists Itzhak Perlman, Renaud Capuçon, Kyung Wha Chung, Janine Jansen, Leonidas Kavakos, Daniel Hope, Nigel Kennedy, Yehudi Menuhin, Midori, Viktoria Mullova, Anne-Sophie Mutter, Arabella Steinbacher, Pinchas Zukerman, and singers Diana Damrau, Plácido Domingo, Dietrich Fischer-Dieskau, Angela Gheorghiu, Matthias Goerne, Susan Graham, Christa Ludwig, and Jessye Norman.

== Reception ==
EUYO is considered one of the best youth orchestras in the world, consistently receiving critical acclaim for its performances. In 2012, The New York Times noted that an EUYO concert at Carnegie Hall was "nearly indistinguishable from what any fine orchestra out to make an impression at Carnegie Hall might present", and that the orchestra proved conclusively that it was among the "elite institutions of its kind". The Financial Times called a 2014 performance at the Proms "sizzling" and at times "breathtaking". The Guardian described the EUYO as having "gripping, exhilaratingly good orchestral playing, surging with energy, laser-sharp focus and collective daring", with "a technical prowess that is downright terrifying". Bachtrack called EUYO a "wonderful celebration of music, friendship and European unity". The Times has called EUYO "the cream of Europe's talent", and that "post-Brexit, this closed door for the UK will be a valuable cultural opportunity lost". The Chicago Tribune called EUYO "special", remarking that the sound had "remarkable character, strength and beauty", and that "if more concerts were performed with as much dedication and passion, maybe the audience for serious music would be growing again". The Washington Post noted that EUYO "need fear no competition."

In 2020, EUYO was chosen as the European Cultural Brand of the Year, setting "an example for the future" as the "living orchestra of the European Union".

== See also ==
- European Union Baroque Orchestra
- European Union Chamber Orchestra
- List of youth orchestras
