= Bréhier =

Bréhier (French: [bʁeje]), anglicised Brehier, is a French surname. Notable people with the surname include:

- Émile Bréhier (1876–1952), French philosopher
- Louis Bréhier (1868–1951), French historian, brother of Émile

== See also ==
- Breier
