= Breier =

Breier is a surname. Notable people with the surname include:

- Benjamin Breier (born 1971), American health care chief executive
- Kimberly Breier (born 1972), American diplomat
- Pascal Breier (born 1992), German footballer

== See also ==
- Breyer (disambiguation)
