= Jianzhou Ba Yin =

Rime dictionary

Jianzhou Ba Yin Ziyi Bianlan
- Traditional Chinese: 建州八音字義便覽
- Simplified Chinese: 建州八音字义便览
Transcriptions
Standard Mandarin
- Hanyu Pinyin: Jiànzhōu Bā Yīn Zìyì Biànlǎn
Northern Min
- Jian'ou Romanized: Gṳ̿ing-ciú Băi Éing Cī-ngī Bīng-lǎng

Jianzhou Ba Yin
- Chinese: 建州八音
Transcriptions
Standard Mandarin
- Hanyu Pinyin: Jiànzhōu Bā Yīn
Northern Min
- Jian'ou Romanized: Gṳ̿ing-ciú Băi Éing

Jianzhou Ba Yin Ziyi Bianlan (simplified Chinese: 《建州八音字义便览》; traditional Chinese: 《建州八音字義便覽》; pinyin: Jiànzhōu Bā Yīn Zìyì Biànlǎn; Kienning Colloquial Romanized: Gṳ̿ing-ciú Băi Éing Cī-ngī Bīng-lǎng), variously translated as Jianzhou Eight-Yin Characters Meaning Handbook or The brief guide of eight tones and literal meaning in Jian Zhou, and often known by its shortened name Jianzhou Ba Yin (Chinese: 《建州八音》; pinyin: Jiànzhōu Bā Yīn; Kienning Colloquial Romanized: Gṳ̿ing-ciú Băi Éing), is a rime dictionary that records character pronunciations in Northern Min during the late Qing dynasty. It was compiled by Lin Duancai from Fuqing in 1795, modelling it after the Fuzhounese rime dictionary Qi Lin Bayin.

== See also ==
- Jian'ou dialect
- Qi Lin Bayin
