= Louisa Jane Bryer =

English missionary (1867–1958)

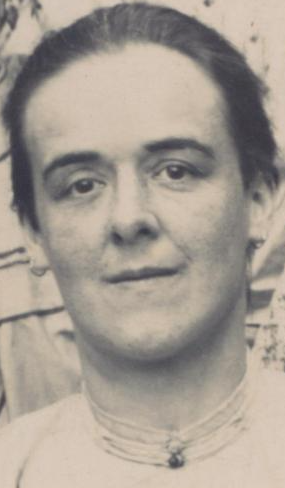
- Missionary to China
- Born: November 17, 1867; Quarndon in Derbyshire, United Kingdom.
- Died: December 25, 1958 (aged 91)
- Title: Evangelist, Mission Administrator
- Parent(s): Alfred Bryer, Mary Hewitt Bryer

Louisa Jane Bryer (Chinese: 布萊爾女士) (November 17, 1867 – December 25, 1958) was an English Protestant Christian missionary to China. Bryer spent 28 years in China (1891–1917; 1924–1926) and in 1896 translated the entire New Testament into the Northern Min language by adopting the Kienning Colloquial Romanized writing system. L J Bryer is remembered today as one of the early founders of the Kienning Christian community.

== Early life and mission to China ==
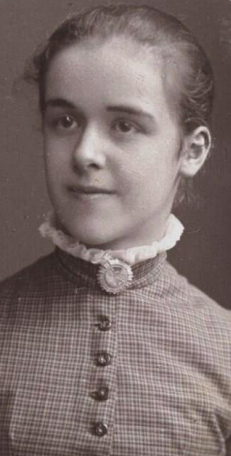
Bryer in 1881.

Born in Quarndon, Derbyshire, Bryer attended the Crossley Orphans’ School (now merged to become The Crossley Heath School today) in Leeds, Yorkshire. In 1891, the Church of England Zenana Missionary Society dispatched Bryer from Islington, London to Fujian Province, China with the status of a missionary. She arrived at the Ciong-Bau (上堡) village Mission Station near Kienning, the capital of the Northwest Prefecture of Fujian Province where she worked alongside other Church of England Zenana Missionary Society missionaries.

== Missionary work in the Kienning Prefecture ==
It was during this period when Bryer first began learning the local Northern Min language and, in order to facilitate the missionary work, developed the Kienning Colloquial Romanized alphabet. From 1891 to 1896, Bryer translated the entire New Testament Bible into the Northern Min language. The local village women became literate in the Kienning New Testament after having been taught in the Kienning Romanized alphabet for three months and Bryer opened two Boarding Schools for girls in that Prefecture. In 1901，Bryer published a comprehensive Anglo - Northern Min dictionary titled A Chinese-English dictionary of the Kien-Ning dialect. Arranged alphabetically according to the Kien-Ning romanized.

Bryer emigrated to Canada in 1938 where she spent the remaining two decades of her life with her brother and sister-in-law in New Westminster, British Columbia.

== Works ==
- The New Testament in Kienning Colloquial Romanized (1896)
- A Chinese-English dictionary of the Kien-Ning dialect. Arranged alphabetically according to the Kien-Ning romanized (1901)
