= Bryerson =

Bryerson may refer to:

- Mrs. Bryerson, a fictional character from the television series Mona the Vampire
- Dawn Bryerson, a fictional character from the film Blackwoods

== See also ==
- Bryer (disambiguation)
