= Henia Bryer =

South African Holocaust survivor (born 1925)

- Born: 1925 (age 100–101); Radom, Poland
- Occupation: Retired educator
- Known for: Holocaust survivor

Henia Bryer (born 1925) is a retired educator from Bloemfontein, South Africa. She was born in Radom, Poland, and is mainly known for her testimony about the Holocaust and Israel's War of Independence. She is the subject of the BBC documentary Prisoner Number A26188: Henia Bryer. Bryer was interned in several concentration camps, and several family members were killed by the Nazis during the Second World War. She celebrated her 100th birthday in 2025.

== Holocaust testimony ==
Bryer was born in Radom in Poland on December 10, 1925, and was 14 when Germany invaded Poland. She survived the Radom Ghetto, the Krakau-Plaszow camp, Majdanek, Auschwitz, and the Death March to Breslau and Bergen-Belsen.

In a 2013 interview with the BBC, Bryer discussed her experience of Germany's invasion of Poland when she was 14, and subsequent internment in the ghetto and concentration camps. Her older brother was executed in the ghetto because he was physically disabled, and her younger sister was killed in Auschwitz because she was too young for forced labor. Of her brother, she told the BBC: "He knew exactly what was happening... he took off his winter coat and he gave it to my mother and he said: 'Give it to someone who will need it. I won't need it any more'. And she came home with a coat." She described thinking she would die of cold during her three months in Auschwitz, in the snow with very little clothing, but another inmate, a former employee of her father, recognised her and gave her clothes taken from another prisoner who had been killed.

Bryer described the depiction of the Krakau-Plaszow camp in the movie Schindler's List as "toned down." According to Bryer, the Germans would sometimes drain prisoners of blood, to use for transfusions for their troops on the Eastern Front. "There were shootings and hangings and there was no crematorium there - only a hill where they used to burn the people and all the ashes used to fly over us." She also described the cruelty of women guards at Krákau-Plászow, characterising Elsa Ehrich as having "eyes like glass, steel. And she always smiled when she hit somebody, a real sadist."

A few days before Auschwitz was liberated by the Russian army, Bryer and thousands of other prisoners were forced on a death march, eventually ending up at Bergen-Belsen. She described Bergen-Belsen as atrocious even in comparison to Auschwitz, with bodies being left to decompose where the people had died. She contracted typhus there. She was liberated from Bergen-Belsen in April 1945.

== Post-war ==
After the war, Bryer and her mother stayed as war refugees in a United Nations displaced persons camp and in Paris, until illegally emigrating to Mandatory Palestine in 1947. She described the declaration of the Israeli state as "A beginning of the healing. For the first time, we were free, and in control of our lives." When asked why she chose to serve in the army during the War of Independence, Bryer replied that everybody had to, but she would have volunteered: "It was the best thing for me. It gave me back my pride in being Jewish. I can't tell you what a feeling it was, to wear that uniform after all that we went through, and to be able to walk tall and proud in the streets. When we marched in the first anniversary of the Jewish state, we marched in that parade, we all cried."

When interviewing with the USC Shoah Foundation, Bryer said she felt she owed the interview to her grandchildren, and "my brother, who was killed, and for my sister, and my father, and for all the people who can't talk today, and never will be able to tell their story."

Bryer initially avoided talking about the Holocaust. In Israel, her mother and she had a rule against talking about the camps. When raising her children, she continued to skirt the topic: “I don’t know if I was right or wrong, but I didn’t talk about it much. If I was asked, I answered." She read about children of Holocaust survivors being affected by their parents’ experiences and saw it in family friends, and read studies of generational Holocaust syndromes. She didn't want her experience to affect her children. Later, she was prompted to testify by public ignorance and downplaying the Holocaust. She kept her serial-number tattoo from Auschwitz in order to counter misinformation and ignorance, "as a sign that it really happened," after encountering people who didn't know anything about the Holocaust.

Bryer says an important lesson is how the prisoners all helped each other. "I'm not a victim anymore. I'm a free person. I put a distance between it...you can't live with hatred and grief."

== Legacy ==
In addition to the BBC documentary, Bryer was the inspiration for the novel The Lightness of Air by Angela Miller-Rothbart, based on stories Bryer told Miller-Rothbart. A video documentation of her testimony is part of the permanent display at the Cape Town Holocaust Centre.
