= Jian'ou =

Jian'ou 建瓯市 Kienow
- County-level city
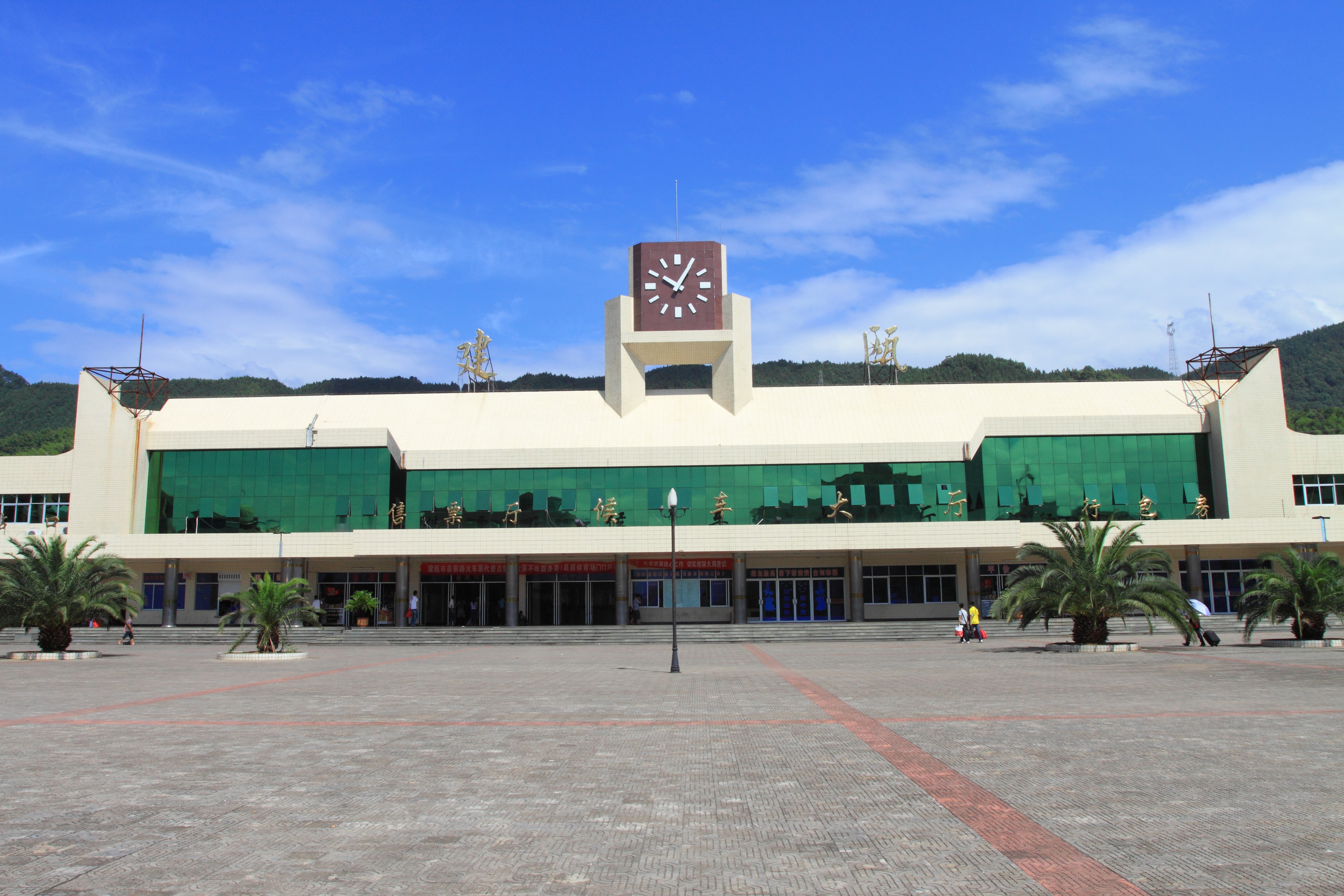
- Jian'ou Railway Station
- Nickname: 芝城, Root Craft City of China
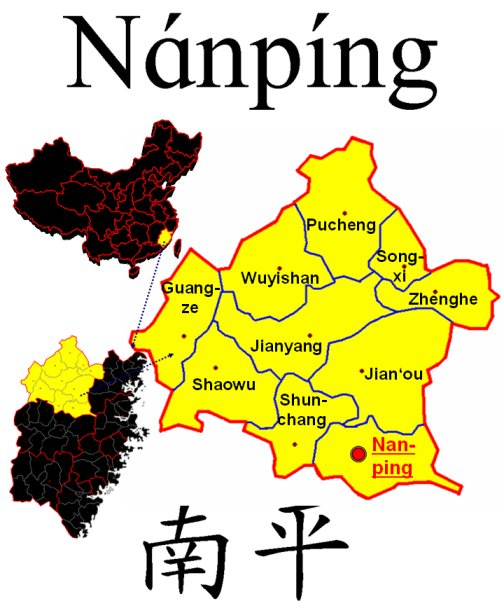
- Location of Jian'ou City within Nanping City

- Location in Fujian
- Coordinates: 27°02′N 118°19′E
- Country: People's Republic of China
- Province: Fujian
- Prefecture-level city: Nanping

Government
  - CPC City Committee Secretary: Qiu Yi

Area
  - Total: 4,199 km^{2} (1,621 sq mi)

Population (2020)
  - Total: 434,451
  - Density: 103.5/km^{2} (268.0/sq mi)
- Time zone: UTC+8 (China Standard)
- Local dialect: Northern Min: Jian'ou dialect
- Website: www.jianou.gov.cn

Chinese name
- Simplified Chinese: 建瓯
- Traditional Chinese: 建甌
- Postal: Kienou
Transcriptions
Standard Mandarin
- Hanyu Pinyin: Jiàn'ōu
- Wade–Giles: Chien⁴-ou¹
Northern Min
- Jian'ou Romanized: Gṳ̿ing-é

Jianning
- Simplified Chinese: 建宁府
- Traditional Chinese: 建寧府
- Literal meaning: Prefecture of Establishing Peace and/or Tranquility
Transcriptions
Standard Mandarin
- Hanyu Pinyin: Jiànníngfǔ
- Wade–Giles: Chien-ning Fu

Jian'ou is a county-level city in Nanping in northern Fujian province, China. Under the name Jianning (Kienning), it was formerly the seat of its own prefecture and was the namesake of its province.

Jian'ou is within a major bamboo and rice-growing area on Jianxi Brook, about 70 kilometres (43 mi) south from Jianyang.

The Jian'ou dialect, a dialect of Northern Min, is spoken in Jian'ou.

== History ==
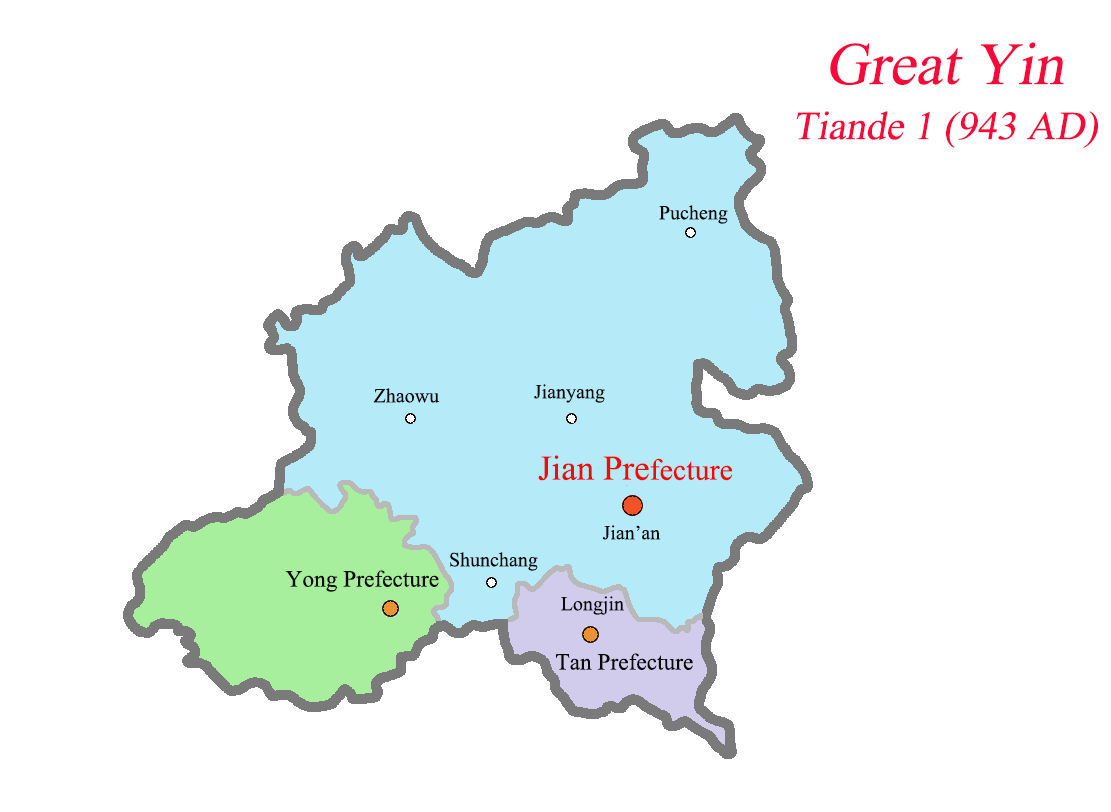
Map of Yin, 943

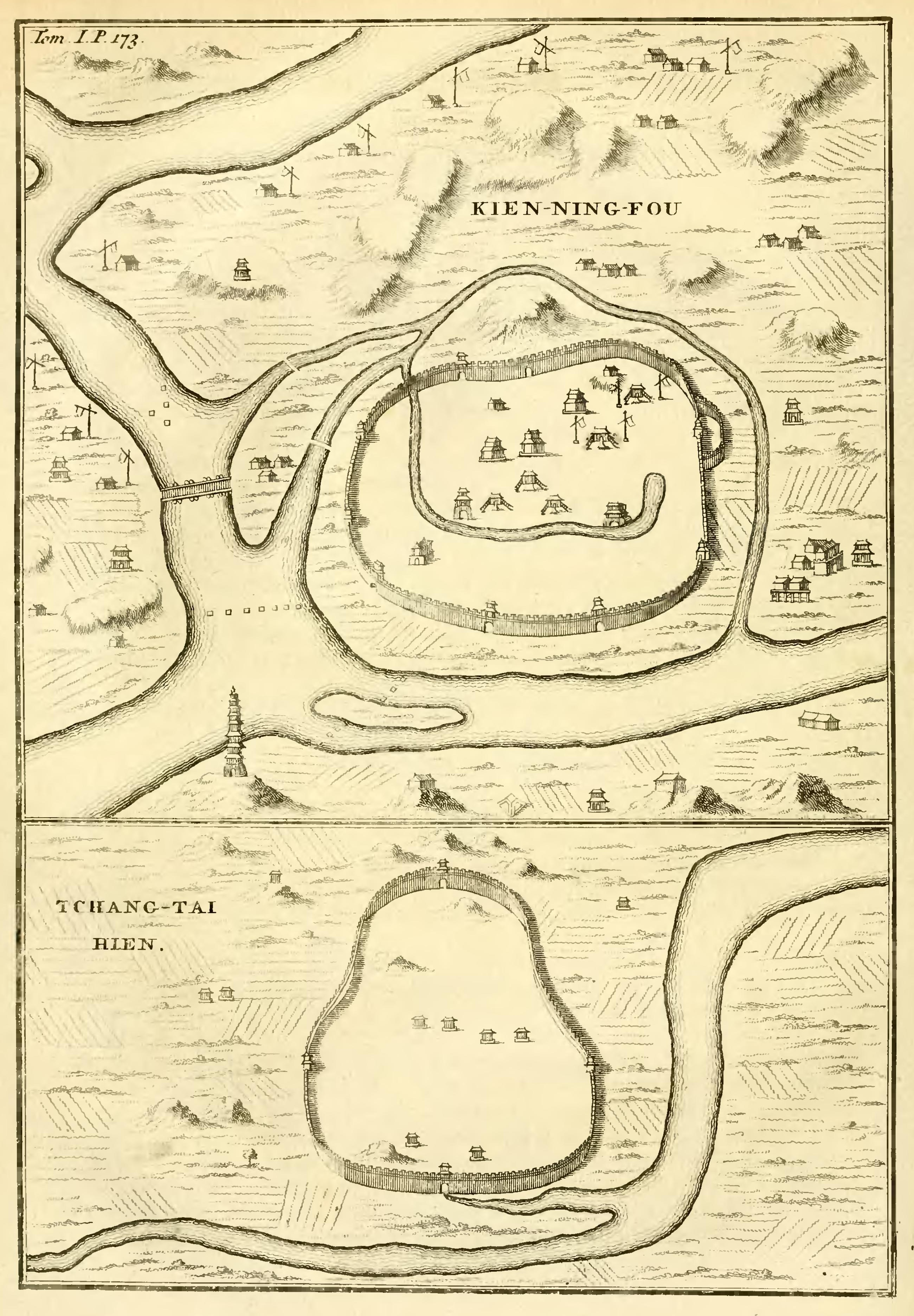
Maps of "Kien-ning-fou" and "Tchang-tai-hien" from Du Halde's 1735 Description of China, based on Jesuit accounts

The city was established in 196 under the name Jian'an – the era name of the reigning Emperor Xian of Han. Along with Fuzhou, they were the earliest-established Chinese territories in the area and thus their province bears their conjoined names: Fu & Jian. The city was once the capital of the Fujian region and also served as the capital of the empire of Yin in AD 943. In the Song dynasty, Jian'an became the seat of Jianning Prefecture (Jianning-fu).

Jian'ou was visited by Marco Polo in 1291 on his way from Hangzhou to Quanzhou. In his Travels, dictated seven years later to a scribe writing in Old French, the name Jianning-fu is romanised as Quenlinfu. The city is, he says,

"of considerable size, and contains three very handsome bridges, upwards of a hundred paces in length and eight paces in width. The men of the place are very handsome, and live in a state of luxurious ease. There is much raw silk produced here and it is manufactured into silk pieces of various sorts. Cottons are also woven of coloured threads, which are carried for sale to every part of the province of Mangi. (Note: Usually anglicised as Manji, the Chinese term Manzi (蛮子, meaning roughly Barbary) was the name north of the Yangzi for the lands south of it, lands now comprising the rump (or Southern) Song dynasty centred at Hangzhou. Enduringly based in the north, the Mongols completed their conquest of the rump Song in 1279, annexing it in its entirety and reducing Hangzhou to one provincial capital among many in their vast Yuan Empire. The Yuan Emperor of course was Polo's nominal host for nearly two decades. For more on the term, cf. Names of China.) The people employ themselves extensively, and export quantities of ginger and galangal. I have been told, but did not myself see the animal, that there are found at this place a species of domestic fowls which have no feathers, their skins being clothed with black hair, resembling the fur of cats. Such a sight must be extraordinary. They lay eggs like other fowls, and they are good to eat. The multitude of tigers renders traveling through the country dangerous, unless a number of persons go in company."

Under the Yuan dynasty, the name was changed from Jianning-Fu to Jianning-Lu. This was a result of an administrative restructuring: formerly, Jian'ou was the capital of the local fu, or prefecture. Jian'ou was made the capital of the local lu, a collection of prefectures still smaller than a province, and was renamed Jianning-Lu accordingly.

== Administration ==
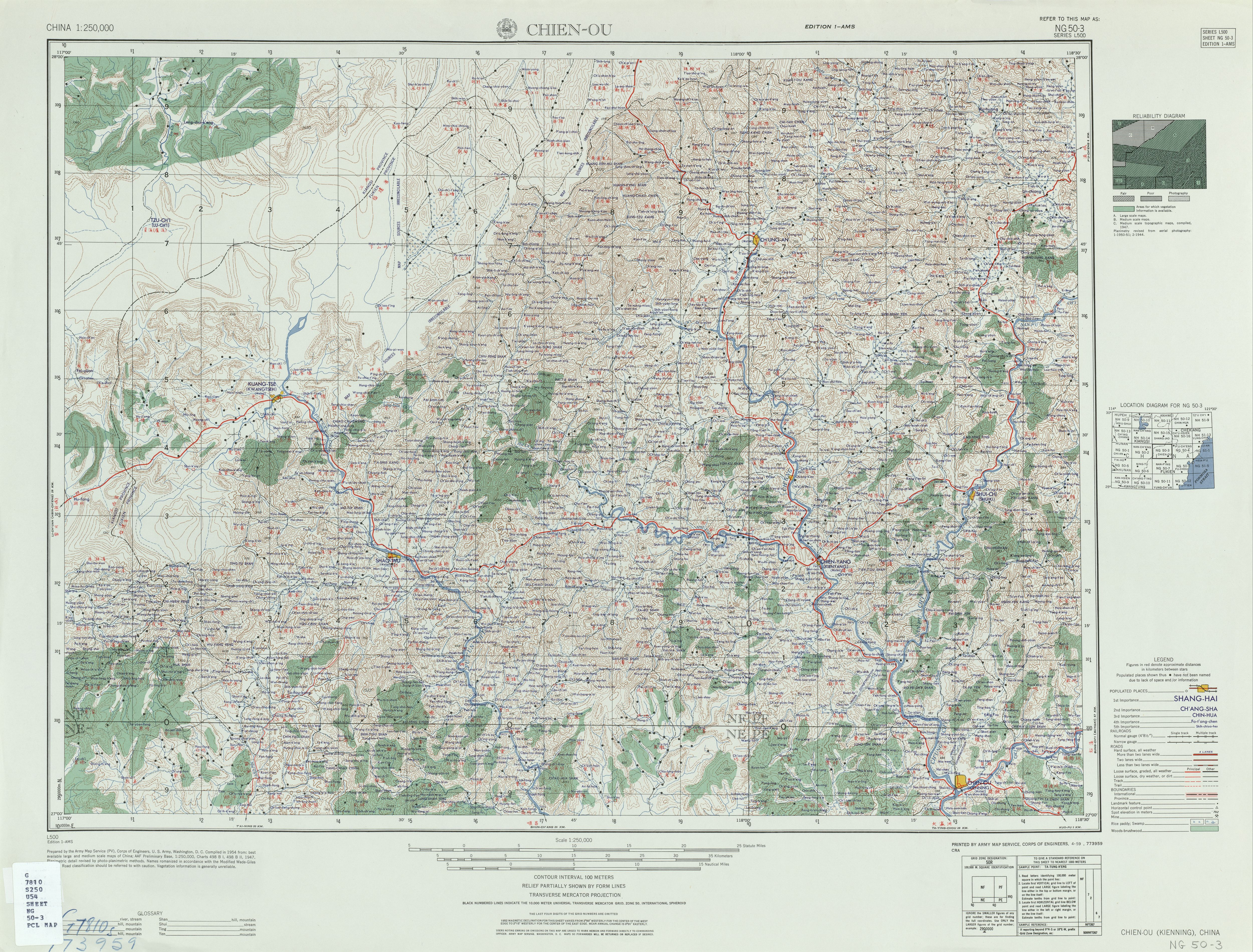
Jian'ou (labeled as Chien-ou, Kienning) (1954)

=== 4 Subdistricts ===
- Ouning Street Office (瓯宁街道): Qilijie Village, Shuixi Village
- Zhishan Street Office (芝山街道): Xida Village, Haodong Village, Mawen Village
- Jian'an Street Office (建安街道): Dong'an Village, Dongmen Village, Qianjie Community
- Tongji Street Office (通济街道): Sanmen Village, Nanmen Village, Dongxi Village, Qiaonan Community, Nanmen Community, Taozhu Community

=== 10 Towns ===
- Xudun (徐墩镇)
- Jiyang (吉阳镇)
- Fangdao (房道镇)
- Dongyou (东游镇)
- Xiaoqiao (小桥镇)
- Yushan (玉山镇)
- Nanya (南雅镇)
- Dikou (迪口镇)
- Xiaosong (小松镇)
- Dongfeng (东峰镇)

=== 4 Townships ===
- Chuanshi (川石乡)
- Shunyang (顺阳乡)
- Shuiyuan (水源乡)
- Longcun (龙村乡)

== Climate ==
Climate data for Jian'ou, elevation 155 m (509 ft), (1991–2020 normals, extremes 1981–2010)
Month	Jan	Feb	Mar	Apr	May	Jun	Jul	Aug	Sep	Oct	Nov	Dec	Year
Record high °C (°F)	28.8 (83.8)	32.4 (90.3)	33.8 (92.8)	35.3 (95.5)	37.3 (99.1)	38.0 (100.4)	41.7 (107.1)	41.7 (107.1)	39.1 (102.4)	37.1 (98.8)	33.2 (91.8)	27.9 (82.2)	41.7 (107.1)
Mean daily maximum °C (°F)	14.1 (57.4)	16.6 (61.9)	19.7 (67.5)	25.1 (77.2)	28.8 (83.8)	31.3 (88.3)	34.9 (94.8)	34.5 (94.1)	31.6 (88.9)	27.2 (81.0)	21.7 (71.1)	16.0 (60.8)	25.1 (77.2)
Daily mean °C (°F)	8.9 (48.0)	11.1 (52.0)	14.2 (57.6)	19.3 (66.7)	23.2 (73.8)	26.1 (79.0)	28.7 (83.7)	28.2 (82.8)	25.6 (78.1)	20.8 (69.4)	15.6 (60.1)	10.2 (50.4)	19.3 (66.8)
Mean daily minimum °C (°F)	5.6 (42.1)	7.6 (45.7)	10.7 (51.3)	15.4 (59.7)	19.4 (66.9)	22.5 (72.5)	24.2 (75.6)	24.1 (75.4)	21.5 (70.7)	16.6 (61.9)	11.8 (53.2)	6.6 (43.9)	15.5 (59.9)
Record low °C (°F)	−5.0 (23.0)	−4.0 (24.8)	−3.2 (26.2)	3.7 (38.7)	9.5 (49.1)	13.7 (56.7)	19.9 (67.8)	18.0 (64.4)	12.8 (55.0)	4.0 (39.2)	−1.8 (28.8)	−7.2 (19.0)	−7.2 (19.0)
Average precipitation mm (inches)	72.6 (2.86)	106.1 (4.18)	217.4 (8.56)	194.4 (7.65)	257.5 (10.14)	336.3 (13.24)	139.7 (5.50)	147.3 (5.80)	92.7 (3.65)	55.9 (2.20)	72.1 (2.84)	63.2 (2.49)	1,755.2 (69.11)
Average precipitation days (≥ 0.1 mm)	12.5	13.5	18.4	16.9	17.9	17.8	11.9	13.6	9.5	7.6	8.7	9.6	157.9
Average snowy days	0.7	0.5	0	0	0	0	0	0	0	0	0	0.2	1.4
Average relative humidity (%)	82	82	82	80	81	83	77	78	78	77	82	81	80
Mean monthly sunshine hours	86.4	89.8	93.6	115.2	133.4	132.6	236.7	216.2	183.5	169.0	121.5	111.2	1,689.1
Percentage possible sunshine	26	28	25	30	32	32	56	54	50	48	38	35	38
Source: China Meteorological Administration

== Transportation ==
- Railway: Hengfeng–Nanping Railway, Hefei-Fuzhou High-Speed Railway
- Highway: G205, G25 Changchun-Shenzhen Expressway, G3 Beijing–Taipei Expressway
- Coach Station: Jian'ou Station

== Specialty ==
- Fangcun Kompia (房村光饼)
- Xiaosong Bianrou (小松扁肉): originated from Hutou Village, Xiaosong Town
- Fumao Cellar Spirit (福矛窖酒)
- Zhuili chestnut (建瓯锥栗)
- Pressed salted duck (建瓯板鸭)

== Notable people ==
- Li Qiumei

== Scenic ==
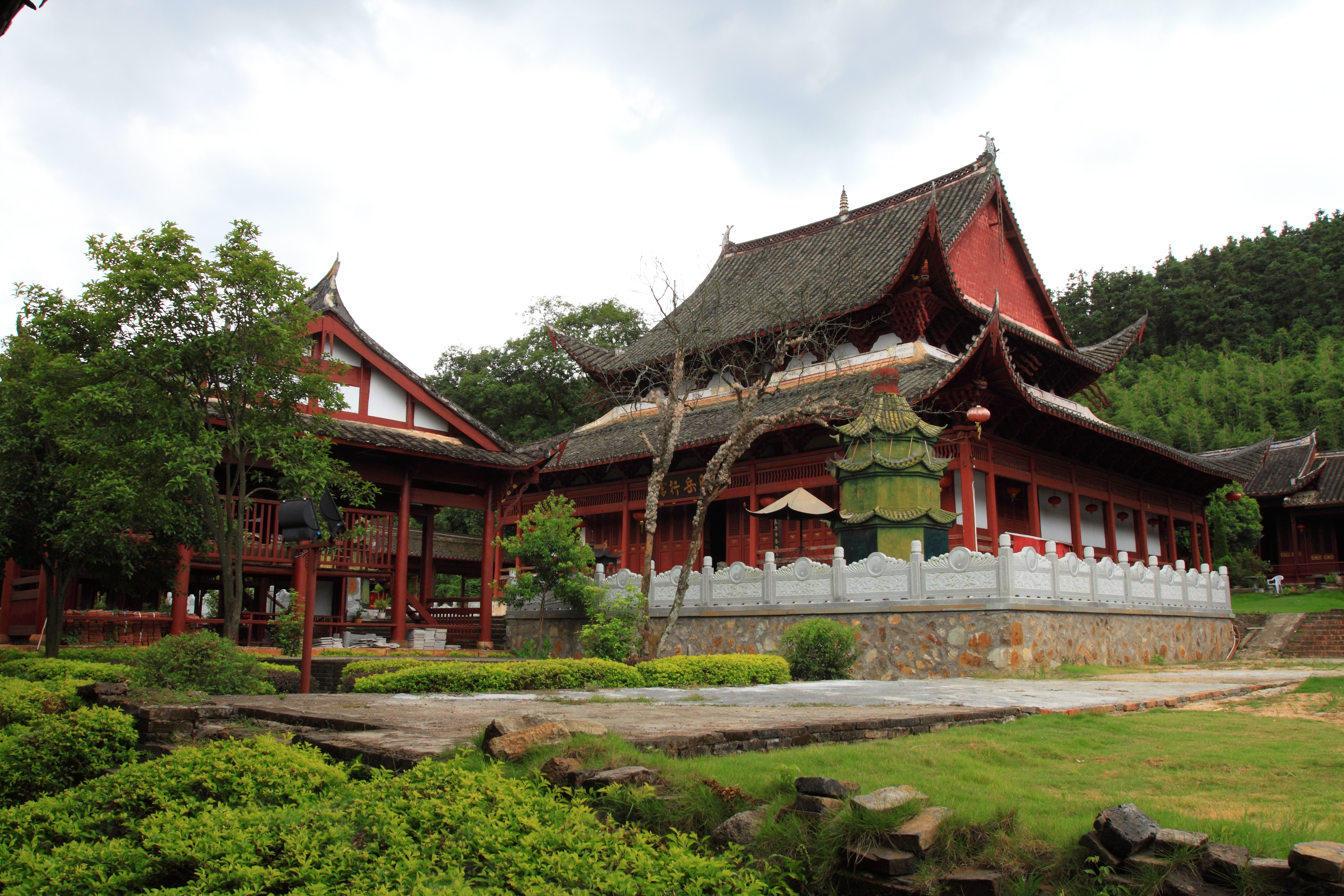
Dongyue Temple

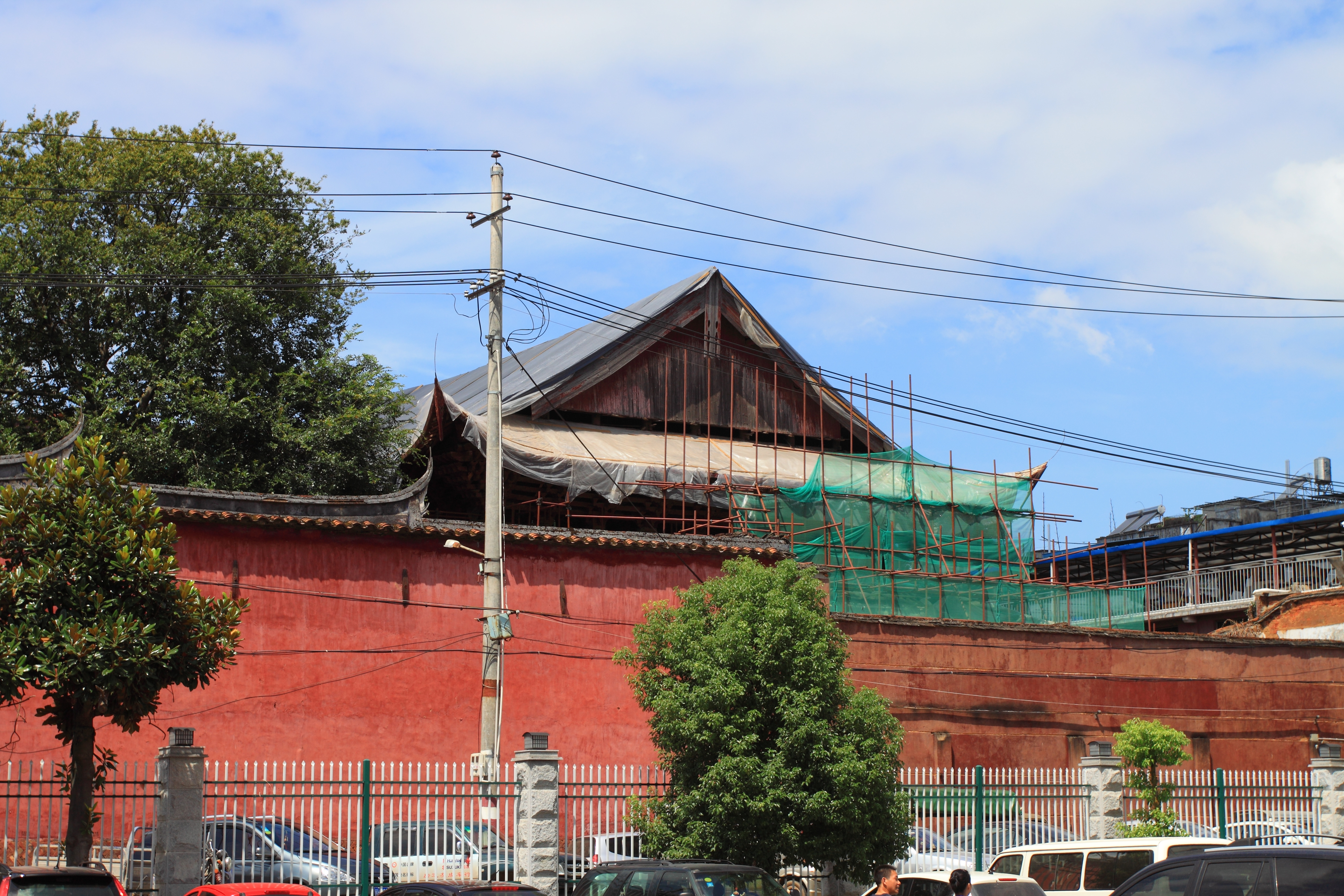
Jian'ou Confucian Temple

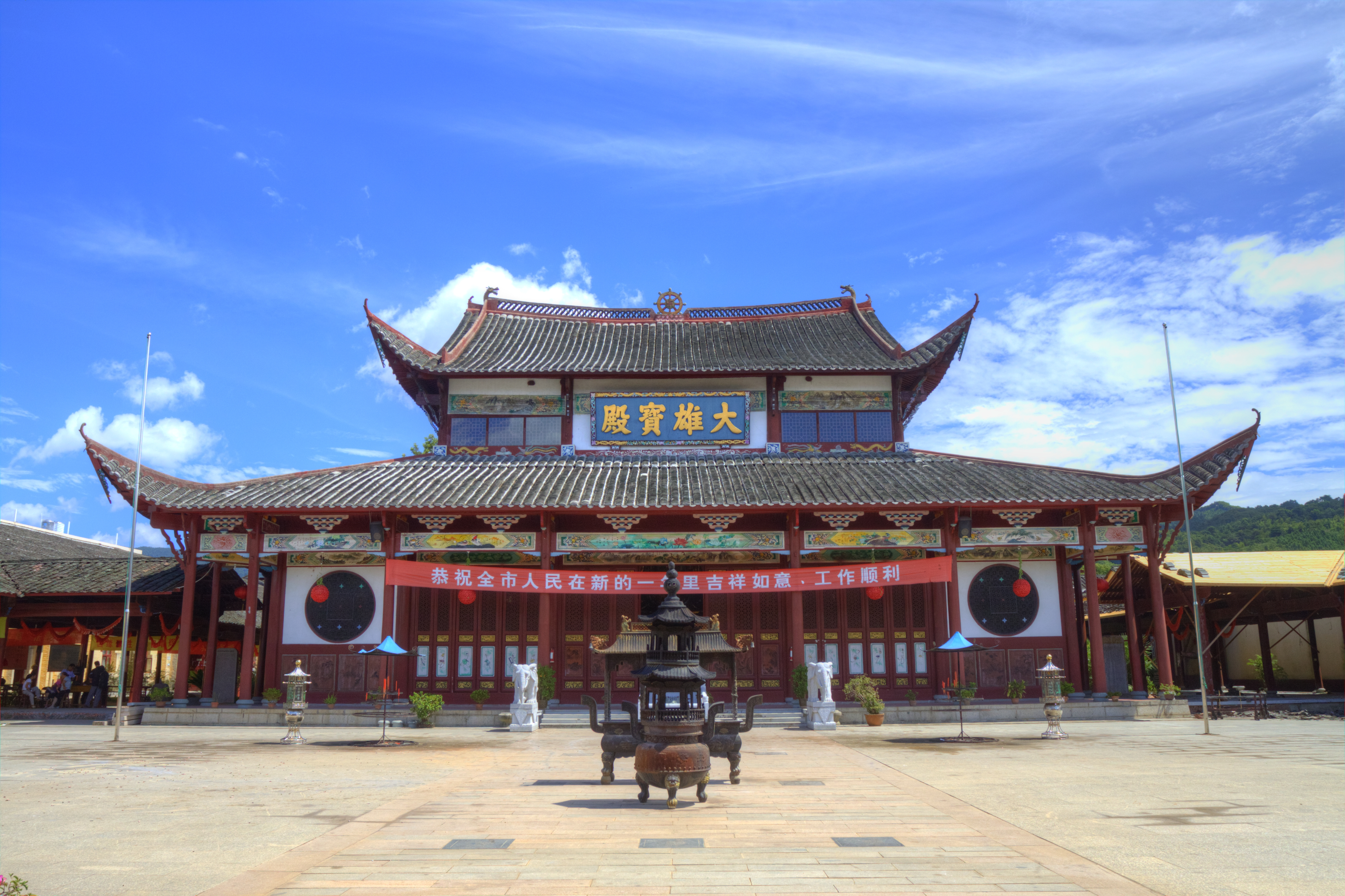
Guangxiao Temple

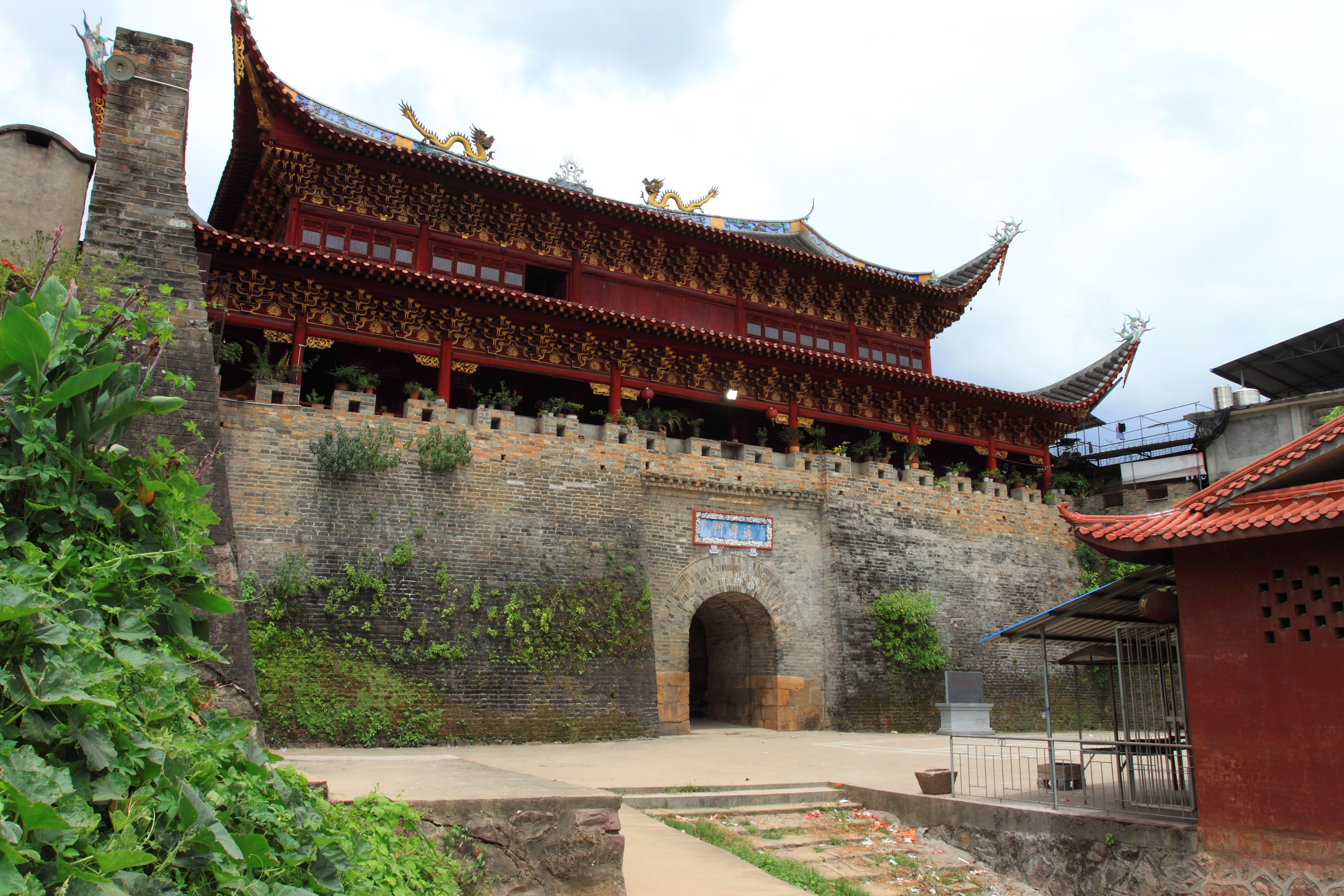
Tongxian Gate

== See also ==
- List of administrative divisions of Fujian
