= Lionel Bryer =

British philanthropist (1928–2006)

Lionel Bryer (14 June 1928 – 3 November 2006) was a South African-British youth arts promoter. He was co-founder of the International Youth Foundation which developed the European Union Youth Orchestra and the International Festival of Youth Orchestras.

== Biography ==
Born in Bloemfontein, South Africa, he studied medicine at Witwatersrand University in Johannesburg . He went to the University of Oxford on winning a Rhodes Scholarship, where he was an avid sportsman, playing rugby, cricket, tennis and skiing. He won a Nuffield research scholarship which brought him to Harvard University as a Research Fellow. He won the first Albert Joachim International Research Prize in 1956 from the International Association for Dental Research.

Afterward he became a successful London dentist with a practice on Sloane Street and later in Chelsea. As a dentist he was innovative, developing a ceramic process for fillings, and founded the International Dental Foundation, which organizes dentistry conferences at Swiss ski resorts.

A violinist who had played with Johannesburg Symphony Orchestra and the University of Witwatersrand Symphony Orchestra, he also played in the University College string orchestra at Oxford.

He had three daughters with his wife Joy Bryer, one of whom is TV presenter Tania Bryer.

== Festival ==
In 1969, Lionel and his American-born wife Joy Bryer founded the International Youth Foundation of Great Britain, with Blyth Major, then director of the Midland Youth Orchestra, and Edward Heath as president. The foundation's goal was increasing international understanding through the unifying bond of music. The first project of the foundation was the 1969 International Festival of Youth Orchestras and Performing Arts, held in St Moritz, Switzerland, with the duo successfully raising funding for 10 festivals in which leading youth orchestras, ballet, folk, choral, dance, opera and visual arts groups took part. Together they travelled the world to recruit musical groups.

The 1969 festival led the British Tourist Authority to encourage the movement to come to the UK, and in 1973 the festival expanded to Aberdeen and London. The local support and facilities found in Aberdeen led the foundation to make that city the permanent base of the festival. The event expanded to incorporate dance, ballet, jazz and choirs as well as the orchestral mainstay. Due to a disagreement over the participation of South African performers, the festival moved to Exeter in 1981 and the following year the final IFYO took place in Rome.

Meantime in Aberdeen, a new incarnation of the event continued successfully. The Aberdeen International Youth Festival ran until 2017.

=== Festival Orchestra ===
The Aberdeen festivals would conclude with a combined Festival Orchestra led by internationally known conductors, over the years including Claudio Abbado, Carlo Maria Giulini, Walter Susskind and Leopold Stokowski, as well as then-youthful James Judd and Simon Rattle. The Orchestra went on to appear at the BBC Proms at the Royal Albert Hall, and as the opening concert of the Edinburgh International Festival in 1978, the first youth orchestra to appear there.

== European Union Youth Orchestra ==
On the UK accession to the European Community, the Bryers founded the European Community Youth Orchestra in 1974. The orchestra, later the European Union Youth Orchestra, set out to demonstrate how music could be a symbol of the European ideal of a united community of nations, and is officially sponsored by the European Parliament. Today the orchestra comprises up to 140 players, who represent all member countries of the European Union, selected each year from over 4,000 candidates aged 16 to 26 by rigorous auditions.
