= Breyer =

Breyer may refer to:

== People ==
- Charles Breyer (born 1941), United States District Judge
- Charles Breyer (soldier) (1844–1914), English soldier who fought in the American Civil War and was awarded the Medal of Honor
- Gyula Breyer (1893–1921), Hungarian chess player
- Jacques Breyer (1922–1996), French writer and esotericist
- Jim Breyer (born 1961), American venture capitalist
- Johann Breyer (1925–2014), Nazi German genocide criminal
- Carl Magnus von Breyer (1746–1813), Baltic German naval officer in the Imperial Russian Navy
- Karl Wilhelm Friedrich von Breyer (1771–1818), German historian
- Mirko Breyer (1863–1946), Croatian writer, bibliographer, and antiquarian
- Stephen Breyer (born 1938), Associate Justice of the U.S. Supreme Court
- Tadeusz Breyer (1874–1952), Polish sculptor and medallic artist

== Organizations ==
- Breyer Animal Creations, a company that makes horse figurines
- Breyer State University, an unaccredited, Internet-based entity
- Breyers, a company that makes ice cream

== See also ==
- Breyers
- Bryer
