= Tania Bryer =

British broadcaster (born 1962)

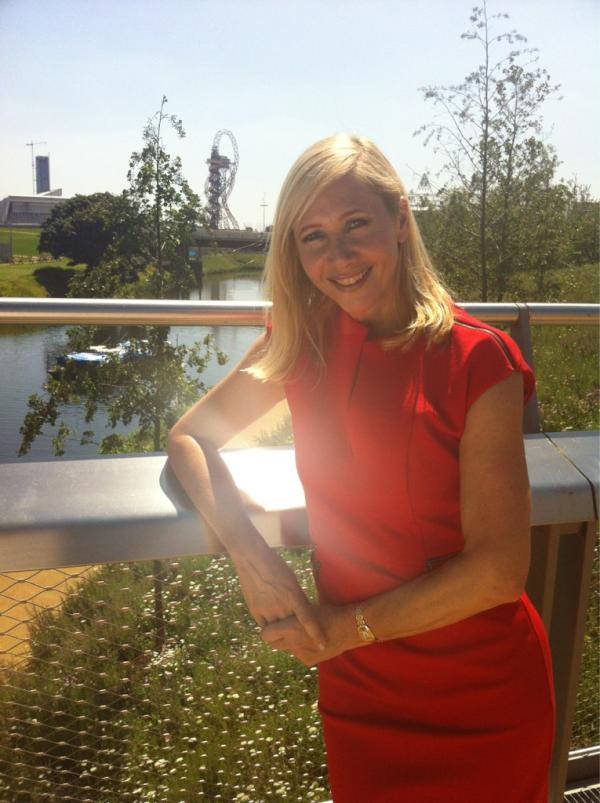
- Bryer in 2015
- Born: 5 July 1962 (age 64)
- Education: Georgetown University
- Occupation: Broadcaster
- Spouses: Tim Moufarrige (m. 1995; div. 2006); Rod Barker (m. 2016)
- Children: 2
- Parent: Lionel Bryer (father)
- Presenting career
- Show: CNBC Meets
- Network: CNBC
- Show: The CNBC Conversation
- Network: CNBC
- Website: taniabryer.com

Tania Bryer OBE (born 5 July 1962) is a British broadcaster who is affiliated with global television network CNBC. She is host and executive producer of the series CNBC Meets with Tania Bryer and is a regular presenter of The CNBC Conversation. In 2017, Bryer was host and executive producer of CNBC's travel series, Trailblazers. She also contributes to CNBC's live programming. Bryer also appears weekly on Sky News Sunrise reviewing the news stories of the day.

== Early life ==
Bryer was educated at Queen's College, London and obtained a Bachelor of Science degree in politics at the School of Foreign Service at Georgetown University, Washington, D.C., from which she graduated in 1984.

== Career ==
After beginning her career in a sales position at Vogue magazine, Bryer joined Sky News in 1991 as a weather presenter. The following year she replaced Ulrika Jonsson on TV-am's daily morning show, Good Morning Britain. In 1997, Tania was involved in a segment of the satirical show Brass Eye in which she warned of the dangers of "cloud damage". Bryer has presented fashion and entertainment shows such as The Supermodels and Showbiz Weekly and presented and co-produced the critically acclaimed Newsmakers series and a six-part series on the fashion industry for Sky News. She also hosted Basic Instincts, a twelve-part series on human behaviour for Sky One. Bryer joined CNBC International in 2011 as Host and Executive Producer of CNBC Meets with Tania Bryer. Alongside CNBC Meets with Tania Bryer, The CNBC Conversation and Sky News Sunrise, in 2017 Bryer was host and executive producer of CNBC's travel series, Trailblazers.

She has covered the 2012 Olympic Games in London for Foxtel and has also contributed on Radio 4's Today programme, ITV's This Morning and appeared on BBC's Celebrity Masterchef and in the series finale of US television drama, The Royals. She has written for various publications including OK! magazine, and has been the London correspondent for the New York City-based CBS shows Entertainment Tonight and Inside Edition.

=== CNBC Meets ===
CNBC Meets with Tania Bryer airs globally on CNBC. The series profiles celebrities and their philanthropy. Bryer has interviewed amongst others, Bill Clinton, Sir Richard Branson, Jimmy Carter, Angelina Jolie, Tom Cruise, Matt Damon, Sean Penn, Archbishop Desmond Tutu, Mayor of London Boris Johnson, Cherie Blair, Tony Blair, Bob Geldof, Naomi Campbell, Sir Philip Green, Chelsea Clinton, Tamara Mellon, Jon Bon Jovi, Andre Agassi, will.i.am, Jessye Norman, Prince Albert II of Monaco, Carla Bruni-Sarkozy, the former Prince Andrew, Duke of York, Lang Lang, Maria Sharapova, Diane von Furstenberg and Dolly Parton.

=== CNBC Meets: In the Press ===
Former US President Bill Clinton admitted to Bryer in 2013 that if the US had gone into Rwanda sooner following the start of the 1994 genocide, at least a third or 300,000 lives could have been saved. Clinton explained that the failure of his administration to act during the genocide, which claimed the lives of around one million Rwandans, was one of the reasons behind the establishment of the Clinton Foundation. "If we'd gone in sooner I believe we could have saved at least a third of the lives that were lost ... it had an enduring impact on me."

In 2014, former US President Jimmy Carter told Bryer he "could have wiped Iran off the map" with the weapons he had during the hostage crisis. Carter also claimed that if he had proved himself "manly" and had used military force, a second term in the Oval Office would have been possible. "I think I would have been re-elected easily if I had been able to rescue our hostages from the Iranians ... I would say I would send one more helicopter because if I had one more helicopter we could have brought out not only the 52 hostages, but also brought out the rescue team, and when that failed, then I think that was the main factor that brought about my failure to be re-elected."

In a 2015 interview, celebrated opera soprano Jessye Norman told Bryer that "racialism was practiced at the highest levels of government" in the US. She attacked the US Congress and the "unprecedented roadblocks" they had put in the way of President Barack Obama: "... the roadblocks that members of Congress put in front of this President are unprecedented and they have very little to do with his policies and very much to do with the fact that he's African American. And I say that loudly because I know it to be true. I'm not running for office so I don't have to hedge my conversations here about this. It's racialism practiced at the highest levels of government, that is a thing which should not even be allowed. We should be better than that, we should be bigger than that."

In a rare interview at Buckingham Palace in 2014, the former Prince Andrew, Duke of York revealed to Bryer that he remains friends with his ex-wife Sarah Ferguson for the sake of his family and because he feels it would be "illogical" not to. He said it was important they have a good relationship for their daughters and called her a "fantastic mother". He told Bryer, "It's just part of life's rich tapestry. If you've been married to somebody I just see it as illogical not to be a friend at the end of the day, regardless of what your set of circumstances are." The Duke also spoke about his time in the Royal Navy and revealed that he feared for his life during the Falklands War when he was shot at as he co-piloted a Sea King helicopter during one mission. "It's not particularly nice to be shot at and I can attest to that and you just look at life in a different way and you try to achieve more."

In 2011, Naomi Campbell showed Bryer her childhood home in Streatham, London. She also addressed her past aggressive behaviour, her five-year battle to overcome cocaine addiction and her close relationship with Nelson Mandela.

In 2014, Matt Damon revealed to Bryer that he would be "open" to reprising the role of Jason Bourne. Damon talked about stardom, his upbringing and how meeting childhood friend Ben Affleck changed their lives. He spoke about the battles they had to overcome to make Good Will Hunting and how he felt when he won his Oscar. He also discussed why he chooses to keep his family out of the spotlight and how he copes with fame: "It kind of happens overnight and you're aware that the world is exactly the same as it was yesterday … It's a very surreal experience because you know intellectually that the world is the same, it's just never ever going to be the same for you."

Richard Desmond told Bryer in 2011 that being described as "porn baron" or "porn king" was "inaccurate". He says: "Porn to me is illegal and we had magazines which were sold through WH Smith and John Menzies." Desmond called Rupert Murdoch both an "inspiration" and a "rival", but said he is not "the greatest manager" he has ever come across. Desmond also talked about launching celebrity magazine OK! in 1993 in a challenge to Hello!, which he claimed was "dull" and "out of touch" with the British public. Desmond said taking on Hello! was the "hardest thing" the company had ever done. He explained OK! overtook its rival with the help of Michael Jackson's baby, the death of Princess Diana and the Beckhams.

Bryer was the last person to interview Vidal Sassoon. In a highly personal and moving interview he spoke about his childhood, his years in a Jewish orphanage in the East End of London and candidly about how his mother could not afford to look after them during the Depression. Sassoon talked about how he revolutionised the hair industry in the 1960s, how he grew his global hair empire and how he overcame many difficulties such as the death of his brother and his daughter, and how he was facing leukaemia.

London Mayor Boris Johnson admitted frittering away his student years "fooling around", but said he hoped his "embarrassing" antics with the Bullingdon Club drinking society could now be forgotten. Reminded of his membership of the Bullingdon alongside Eton contemporary David Cameron, the Mayor told Bryer: "I owe the Oxford Union and the institutions there a huge amount. If I have a regret, it's that I spent so much time fooling around, frittering my time at Oxford when I should have focused more on serious stuff."

Cherie Blair told Bryer that the press attention on her life in Downing Street had been 'hurtful' at times and that it was naive not to give any interviews when her husband first came into office. She thought, "Why would anyone necessarily be interested in other things? ... But because people were interested and – because I didn't give interviews – it ended up that everything became focused on my appearance." While Blair was sometimes angered and "hurt" at the press attention on herself and her children, she said she did not have contempt for the British press: "Everyone's only human and there were times when of course it was hurtful. But he (Tony) always said to me, 'You complain about the British press like you complain about the British weather: it's a fact of life. When it's nice, the sun comes out and we celebrate that, but you have to take the rain as well.'"

=== The CNBC Conversation ===
Bryer also presents The CNBC Conversation series meeting international headline-makers and conducting rare interviews including HSH Prince Albert II of Monaco, Former South African President F.W. De Klerk, Former UN Secretary General Kofi Annan and fashion titan Tom Ford.

=== The CNBC Conversation: In the Press ===
HSH Prince Albert II of Monaco talked to Bryer about his mother Grace Kelly and the values that his parents instilled in him as a child.

Bryer sat down with fashion designer and businessman Tom Ford for an interview about his Texas childhood, his feelings about Yves Saint Laurent, who wrote him "harsh" letters at the time he was creative director of the fashion house, and how he spiralled into depression and his mid-life crisis. Ford also talked about his relationship with his partner Richard Buckley and how fatherhood has changed his life. He gave a few hints about his new screenplay and revealed that he would love to dress the Duchess of Cambridge. "She's a beautiful woman, she's smart and I think she's doing an incredible job'.

Former U.N. Secretary General Kofi Annan told Bryer that he was "bitterly disappointed" that the international community had not responded faster to the Ebola crisis, as the public health systems in the three African countries affected had "collapsed". He warned that a "dark cloud" could be cast over Africa if the press continued its scaremongering over Ebola.

Former South African President F.W. de Klerk spoke about his transformative role as the final head of state under Apartheid rule, in an interview with Bryer in June 2015. De Klerk was appointed to lead a country racially segregated by law, but won the Nobel Peace Prize in 1993 along with the late Nelson Mandela for working to end Apartheid. In the exclusive interview, de Klerk discussed his "real friendship" with Mandela and how the fall of the Berlin Wall helped smooth the way for Apartheid's collapse. He also discussed the corruption allegations regarding South Africa's hosting of the 2010 World Cup and the government of Jacob Zuma.

=== Sustainable Future ===
Bryer presents CNBC's Sustainable Future, the series examines how the planet's biggest businesses are changing to reduce their impact on climate change; the first episode aired on 12 April 2021.

=== Finding Solutions ===
Bryer presents CNBC's Finding Solutions series, which focuses on individuals from around the world who are actively making a difference to our planet and who have been recognised for it.

== Charity work ==
Bryer supports a number of charities and philanthropic initiatives. She hosts the King Hussein Cancer Foundation's Hope Galas in Washington, D.C., Dubai, Abu Dhabi and Amman, in the presence of King Abdullah II and Queen Rania of Jordan. She also hosted the International Shafallah Conference in Qatar on Crisis, Conflict and Disability, moderating panel discussions with representatives of the United Nations and International Refugee Organisation.

Bryer has hosted the Women's Forum in Deauville, and the Women of the Future Awards in London attended by Cherie Blair and Princess Anne. She also hosts the annual London Means Business Gala event for The Mayor of London and the Foundation for Future London to support the legacy of the 2012 Olympic Games, and she was Master of Ceremonies at the 2015 inaugural Walkabout Foundation Gala in London with guest President Bill Clinton. Bryer is the chair of the National Events Committee for Cancer Research UK and a patron of The Miscarriage Association and The Alzheimer's Society. During the General Election 2015, she hosted a Dementia Hustings with representatives from the UK's three main political parties, including Secretary of State for Health, Jeremy Hunt. She supports Marie Curie Cancer Care and Caudwell Children and is an Ambassador for the Health Lottery.

== Personal life ==
Bryer married Tim Moufarrige, a senior executive of sports agency IMG in September 1995 but divorced him in 2006. The couple have two daughters. In July 2016, Bryer married hedge fund manager Rod Barker. She is the daughter of Joy and Lionel Bryer.

== Episodes ==
=== CNBC Meets: Episodes ===
No.	Original air date	Title	Guests
1	September 2011	CNBC Meets Tamara Mellon	Tamara Mellon
2	September 2011	CNBC Meets Richard Desmond	Richard Desmond, Simon Cowell, Roger Daltrey
3	October 2011	CNBC Meets Naomi Campbell	Naomi Campbell, Quincy Jones, Simon Le Bon, Nick Rhodes
4	October 2011	CNBC Meets John Caudwell	John Caudwell, Sir Elton John, David Furnish, Sarah, Duchess of York, Peter Andre
5	November 2011	CNBC Meets Kelly Hoppen	Kelly Hoppen, Vidal Sassoon, Gary Rhodes
6	November 2011	CNBC Meets Vidal Sassoon	Vidal Sassoon, Mary Quant
7	April 2012	CNBC Meets Jon Bon Jovi	Jon Bon Jovi, Bill Clinton
8	July 2012	CNBC Meets Richard Branson	Richard Branson, Jimmy Carter, Archbishop Desmond Tutu, Eve Branson
9	June 2012	CNBC Meets Andre Agassi	Andre Agassi
10	July 2012	CNBC Meets Sherry Lansing	Sherry Lansing, Tom Cruise
11	August 2012	CNBC Meets Carla Bruni Sarkozy	Carla Bruni Sarkozy
12	September 2012	CNBC Meets will.i.am	will.i.am, Angela Ahrendts, apl.de.ap, Debra Adams
13	October 2012	CNBC Meets Jochen Zeitz	Jochen Zeitz, Dame Vivienne Westwood, François-Henri Pinault, Andreas Kronthaler
14	November 2012	CNBC Meets Sir Philip Green	Sir Philip Green, Karren Brady
15	March 2013	CNBC Meets President Clinton	Bill Clinton, Chelsea Clinton, Sean Penn
16	April 2013	CNBC Meets Mayor Boris Johnson	Boris Johnson, Lord Sebastian Coe
17	May 2013	CNBC Meets Cherie Blair CBE	Cherie Blair, Tony Blair, Sir Bob Geldof
18	December 2013	CNBC Meets Lang Lang	Lang Lang
19	May 2014	CNBC Meets Matt Damon	Matt Damon, Gary White
20	June 2014	CNBC Meets Sungjoo Kim	Sungjoo Kim, Albert II, Prince of Monaco
21	July 2014	CNBC Meets Aerin Lauder	Aerin Lauder, Michael Kors, William Lauder
22	August 2014	CNBC Meets H.R.H. Duke of York	Prince Andrew, Duke of York, Peter Jones
23	October 2014	CNBC Meets President Carter	Jimmy Carter, Rosalynn Carter, Angelina Jolie, William Hague
24	December 2014	CNBC Meets Lauren Bush Lauren	Lauren Bush Lauren, David Lauren
25	March 2015	CNBC Meets Maria Sharapova	Maria Sharapova, Billie Jean King, Virginia Wade, Nick Bollettieri
26	April 2015	CNBC Meets Jessye Norman	Jessye Norman, Gloria Steinem
27	May 2015	CNBC Meets Diane von Furstenberg	Diane von Furstenberg, Tina Brown, Naomi Campbell, Natalia Vodianova, Suzy Menkes
28	June 2016	CNBC Meets Dolly Parton	Dolly Parton, Kenny Rogers
29	November 2017	CNBC Meets Melinda Gates	Melinda Gates, Jim Yong Kim, HRH Crown Princess Mary of Denmark
30	June 2018	CNBC Meets: Defining Values	Li Bingbing
31	July 2018	CNBC Meets: Defining Values	Charles Chen Yidan
32	July 2018	CNBC Meets: Defining Values	Michelle Ong
33	July 2018	CNBC Meets: Defining Values	Yao Ming
34	July 2018	CNBC Meets: Defining Values	Kevin Rudd
35	June 2019	CNBC Meets: Defining Values	Novak Djokovic
36	July 2019	CNBC Meets: Defining Values	H.S.H Prince Albert II of Monaco
37	July 2019	CNBC Meets: Defining Values	Yo-Yo Ma
38	July 2019	CNBC Meets: Defining Values	Dr. Fei-Fei Li
39	July 2019	CNBC Meets: Defining Values	Simon Yam

=== The CNBC Conversation: Episodes ===
No.	Original air date	Title
1	September 2014	The CNBC Conversation: Sir Keith Mills
2	November 2014	The CNBC Conversation: Kofi Annan
3	January 2015	The CNBC Conversation: H.S.H Prince Albert II of Monaco
4	February 2015	The CNBC Conversation: Tom Ford
5	June 2015	The CNBC Conversation: President FW de Klerk
6	January 2016	The CNBC Conversation: Carolyn Fairburn
7	February 2016	The CNBC Conversation: David Hertz
8	August 2016	The CNBC Conversation: Michel Roux Junior
9	September 2016	The CNBC Conversation: Goldie Hawn
10	October 2016	The CNBC Conversation: Dame Vivienne Westwood
11	November 2016	The CNBC Conversation: Bernard Arnault
12	December 2016	The CNBC Conversation: David Walliams
13	January 2017	The CNBC Conversation: Karl Lagerfeld
14	February 2017	The CNBC Conversation: Arianna Huffington
15	October 2017	The CNBC Conversation: Jane Fonda
16	January 2018	The CNBC Conversation: Jean-Paul Agon
17	February 2018	The CNBC Conversation: Queen Rania Al Abdullah
18	April 2018	The CNBC Conversation: Kate Hudson
19	August 2018	The CNBC Conversation: Jane Wurwand
20	September 2018	The CNBC Conversation: Victoria Beckham at London Fashion Week
21	December 2018	The CNBC Conversation: Sarah Brightman
22	January 2019	The CNBC Conversation: Dame Ellen MacArthur
23	February 2019	The CNBC Conversation: Helle Thorning-Schmidt at The World Economic Forum
24	March 2019	The CNBC Conversation: Rose McGowan
25	September 2019	The CNBC Conversation: Livia Firth
26	October 2019	The CNBC Conversation: Professor Muhammad Yunus
27	July 2020	The CNBC Conversation: Phumzile Mlambo-Ngcuka, Executive director of UN Women
28	September 2020	The CNBC Conversation: Lang Lang
29	October 2020	The CNBC Conversation: Nile Rodgers
29	February 2022	The CNBC Conversation: Alexandre Ricard, Chairman & Chief Executive Officer of Pernod Ricard

=== Trailblazers: Episodes ===
No.	Original air date	Title
1	June 2017	Trailblazers: Lang Lang
2	July 2017	Trailblazers: Natalia Vodianova
3	August 2017	Trailblazers: Amitabh Bachchan
4	September 2017	Trailblazers: Tinie Tempah
5	October 2017	Trailblazers: Gwyneth Paltrow
6	June 2018	Trailblazers: Jean Paul Gaultier
7	July 2018	Trailblazers: Gloria Estefan
8	September 2018	Trailblazers: Cuba Gooding Jr.
9	October 2018	Trailblazers: Andrea Bocelli
10	March 2019	Trailblazers: Lenny Kravitz
11	May 2019	Trailblazers: Nico Rosberg
12	July 2019	Trailblazers: Nobu Matsuhisa
13	September 2019	Trailblazers: Elle Macpherson
14	November 2019	Trailblazers: Shah Rukh Khan

=== The Leadership League: Episodes ===
No.	Original air date	Title
1	June 2019	The Leadership League: Robert Lewandowski
