= Charles Breyer (soldier) =

English soldier (1844–1914)

- Born: June 19, 1844; England
- Died: September 9, 1914 (aged 70)
- Burial place: Limerick Church Burial Ground
- Military career
- Allegiance: United States of America
- Branch: United States Army
- Rank: Sergeant
- Unit: 90th Regiment Pennsylvania Volunteer Infantry - Company I
- Conflicts: First Battle of Rappahannock Station
- Awards: Medal of Honor

Sergeant Charles Breyer (June 19, 1844 – September 9, 1914) was an English soldier who fought in the American Civil War. Breyer received the country's highest award for bravery during combat, the Medal of Honor, for his action during the First Battle of Rappahannock Station in Virginia on 23 August 1862. He was honored with the award on 8 July 1896.

== Biography ==
Breyer was born in England on 19 June 1844 and enlisted into the 90th Pennsylvania Volunteer Infantry at Philadelphia, Pennsylvania. He died on 9 September 1914 and his remains are interred at the Limerick Church Burial Ground in Pennsylvania.

== Medal of Honor citation ==
Voluntarily, and at great personal risk, Bryer picked up an unexploded shell and threw it away, thus doubtless saving the life of a comrade whose arm had been taken off by the same shell.

== See also ==
- List of American Civil War Medal of Honor recipients: A–F
