= Kienning Colloquial Romanized =

Romanization system used to compile the Kienning dialect of the Northern Min language

Kienning Colloquial Romanized Gṳ̿ing-nǎing-hǔ Gâ̤ Tǔ-kióng Lô̤-mǎ-cī Kienning Romanized, Jianzhou Romanized, Jian'ou Romanized
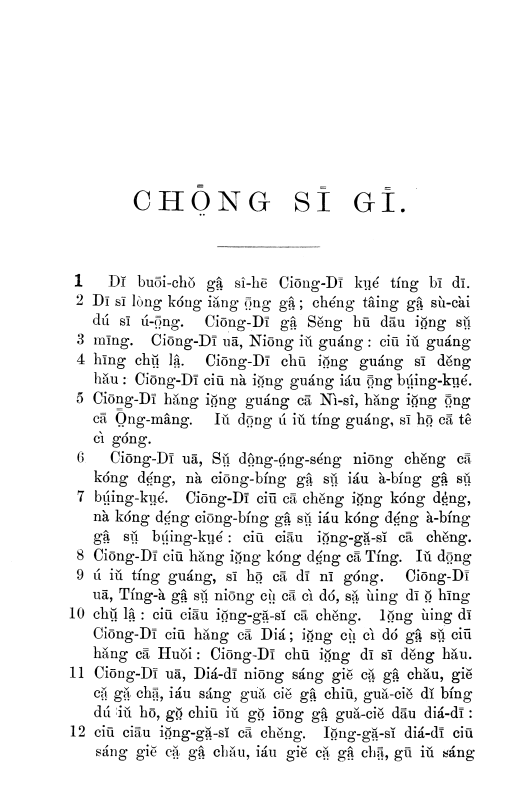
- The Kienning Colloquial Romanized Book of Genesis Chapter 1, published by the British and Foreign Bible Society.
- Script type: Latin alphabet (modified)
- Creator: Missionaries: Miss L.J. Bryer, Hugh. S. Phillips and Mrs Minnie Phillips
- Period: 1896–1922
- Languages: Jian'ou dialect of the Northern Min language

The Kienning Colloquial Romanized Alphabet (建寧府土腔羅馬字, Gṳ̿ing-nǎing Lô̤-mǎ-cī) is a romanization system adopted by Western missionaries to compile the Kienning dialect (modern day Jian'ou City) of the Northern Min language in the Fujian Province of China.

== History ==
During the last decade of the 19th century, Western missionaries from the Church of England Zenana Missionary Society arrived in Kienning Prefecture (which also comprises the present day Nanping City) to evangelize. However they soon realized that the majority of the residents in the region did not comprehend Mandarin speech nor the Foochow dialect when Foochow Christians tried to preach to them, hence the missionaries studied an existing Chinese publication titled The Eight Tones of Kien-chou (建州八音) and in 1896 the missionaries devised a new Latinized alphabet system for the Kienning dialect, which emulated the Foochow Romanization system. Among the early translators were Miss L.J. Bryer and other ladies of the Zenana Mission with the help of native teachers, translated the New Testament into the Kienning Romanized Colloquial writing system by 1895. It was seen through the press by Miss B. Newcombe and published by the British and Foreign Bible Society in London in 1896.

By 1898, the English missionary couple Hugh S. Phillips and Minnie Phillips had translated and published a revised edition of the Gospel of Mark into the Kienning Colloquial Romanized alphabet. A revised edition of the Gospel of Matthew was completed and published in 1900 and by the following year, saw the printing of A Chinese–English Dictionary of the Kien-ning Dialect, which taught people how to read this particular romanization system. The Kienning Colloquial Romanized alphabet played a significant role in the spread of Christianity in Kienning Prefecture and was widely circulated within the local churches of that region. The missionary records showed that the local women were able to master the reading of the Kienning Romanized Bible after three months. Nevertheless, literacy in that writing system even amongst the local Christians did not reach 100 percent.

After the Republic of China was formed, romanized writing systems of all the various Sinitic languages were met with suppression from the local authorities, and after the Chinese Communist Party came to power, the government began the campaign of promoting the use of Mandarin and forcibly suppressing all other "dialects". As a result, the Kienning Colloquial Romanized alphabet could not be used in public settings. Despite this, today the older generation of Kienning Christian congregations are still able to read and write in this writing system whilst some of the younger generation may have regrettably lost their literacy in their own language.

== Spelling schemes ==
Due to differences between Northern Fujian dialects, the Kienning Romization can only accurately reflect the pronunciation of words from the Jian'ou dialect, and do not necessarily correspond perfectly with other dialects, nonetheless the Jian'ou dialect is used as the predominant standard when writing the Northern Min language and could be used to represent the other Northern Min dialects. For the past century, the Jian'ou has also undergone major changes and therefore there would certainly be some degree of variance between the Jian'ou dialect of the late 19th century and that which is spoken today.

=== Consonants ===
| Kienning Romanization | Example | Pronunciation |
|---|---|---|
| b | 邊 | /p/ |
| p | 波 | /pʰ/ |
| d | 直 | /t/ |
| t | 他 | /tʰ/ |
| g | 求 | /k/ |
| k | 氣 | /kʰ/ |
| (not marked) | 鶯 | /ʔ/ |
| s | 時 | /s/ |
| h | 非 | /x/ |
| c | 曾 | /ts/ |
| ch | 出 | /tsʰ/ |
| m | 問 | /m/ |
| n | 日 | /n/ |
| ng | 語 | /ŋ/ |
| l | 柳 | /l/ |

=== Vowels* ===
| Kienning Romanization | Example | Pronunciation |
|---|---|---|
| i | 時 | /i/ |
| ing | 年 | /iŋ/ |
| e̤ng | 穠 | /œyŋ/ |
| o | 梅 | /ʊ/ |
| e̤ | 兒 | /œ/ |
| uang | 黃 | /uaŋ/ |
| ai | 犁 | /ai/ |
| aing | 田 | /aiŋ/ |
| ṳing | 園 | /yiŋ/ |
| io̤ | 茄 | /iɔ/ |
| uoi | 蔴 | /uɛ/ |
| u | 吳 | /u/ |
| ia | 舍 | /ia/ |
| iang | 正 | /iaŋ/ |
| ie | 㓟 | /iɛ/ |
| ṳ | 魚 | /y/ |
| a̤ | 臍 | /ɛ/ |
| iu | 油 | /iu/ |
| e | 茅 | /ɪ/ |
| o̤ng | 囥 | /ɔŋ/ |
| ong | 桐 | /oŋ/ |
| uai | 發 | /uai/ |
| uo̤ng | 放 | /uɔŋ/ |
| a | 茶 | /a/ |
| o̤ | 峨 | /ɔ/ |
| io̤ng (Note: The dots are written only in syllables that have zero initial.)/iong | 陽 | /iɔŋ/ |
| uing | 蟠 | /uiŋ/ |
| ṳe | 蛇 | /yɛ/ |
| eng | 人 | /eiŋ/ |
| uaing | 販 | /uaiŋ/ |
| au | 柴 | /au/ |
| ang | 南 | /aŋ/ |
| iau | 橋 | /iau/ |
| ua | 過 | /ua/ |

=== Tones ===
Tonal Chart of the Kienning Romanized
| Tonal Ordering | 1 | 2 | 3 | 4 | 5 | 6 | 7 |
| Tonal types | 陰平High level tone | 陽平High rising tone | 上聲Low falling tone | 陰去Low falling and rising tone | 陽去Middle rising and falling tone | 陰入Middle rising stopped tone | 陽入High level stopped tone |
| Tone Value | ˥˦ (54) | merged into Low falling and rising tone (陰去) today | ˨˩ (21) | ˧ (33) | ˦ (44) | ˨˦ (24) | ˦˨ (42) |
| Kienning Romanized Tone marks (with usage examples after the brackets) | ˊ (á) | ˆ (â) | ˇ (ǎ) | ̿ (a̿) | ˉ (ā) | ˘ (ă) | ˋ (à) |
| Examples | 芝依居 | | 指椅舉 | 志意貴 | 字易脆 | 即益菊 | 集實巨 |

Some fonts can generate the tone 4 mark by placing U+0304 ̄ COMBINING MACRON twice.

== Sample Text ==
This text comes from the dialect's "rhyme-book", i.e., the guide to its standard pronunciation, which has the title 《建州八音》, meaning the "Eight Tones for the Prefecture of Kṳing". The text gives the lyrics to a little ditty, similar to the alphabet song, to help people remember the book's ordering of rhymes:

Sî nîng ně̤ng, mô ě̤ uâng.
Lâi châing hṳ̂ing, ce̤̿ng giô̤ muôi.
Ngû sia̿ ciáng pie̿ ngṳ̂, châ̤ iû mê chio̤̿ ko̤̿ng.
Tông huăi huo̤̿ng dâ, ngô̤ iô̤ng pûing ṳ̂e.
Nêng hua̿ing cha̿u, Nâng giâu gua̿.

The Chinese-character original of this reads as follows.

時年穠，梅兒黃。
犁田園，種茄蔴。
吳舍正㓟魚，臍油茅厝囥。
桐發放茶，峨陽蟠蛇。
人販柴，南橋過。

== Notes ==
Postscript:

*Because of the difference between the dialects of Minbei dialect, the expression of the Roman alphabet of Jianning can only reflect the pronunciation of Jianyao at the time, and it does not necessarily correspond to other dialects. However, using the dialect of Jianning Romanization also makes other dialects. Nowadays, over the past 100 years, the voice of Jian'ou dialect has also changed a lot (for example, adding "elong" ieing (/ieiŋ/) rhyme, "囥" ong rhyme (/oŋ/) is incorporated into "Tong" o̤ng Rhyme (/ɔŋ/)), so the Roman word of its expression is different from the actual pronunciation of today's Jianye.
