= Jian'ou dialect =

Dialect of Northern Min Chinese

Jian'ou
- Gṳ̿ing-é-dī / 建甌事
- Pronunciation: [kuiŋ˧ ɪ˥˦ ti˦]
- Native to: Southern China
- Region: Jian'ou, Fujian province
- Language family: Sino-Tibetan: Sinitic; Chinese; Min; Inland Min; Northern Min; Jian'ou
- Early forms: Proto-Sino-Tibetan: Old Chinese (Note: Min is believed to have split from Old Chinese, rather than Middle Chinese like other varieties of Chinese.); Proto-Min
- Writing system: Chinese character, Kienning Colloquial Romanized

Language codes
- ISO 639-3: –
- Glottolog: jian1240

Jian'ou dialect
- Traditional Chinese: 建甌話
- Simplified Chinese: 建瓯话
Transcriptions
Standard Mandarin
- Hanyu Pinyin: Jiàn'ōuhuà

Alternative Chinese name
- Traditional Chinese: 建甌事
- Simplified Chinese: 建瓯事
Transcriptions
Northern Min
- Jian'ou Romanized: Gṳ̿ing-é-dī ([kuiŋ˧ ɪ˥˦ ti˦])

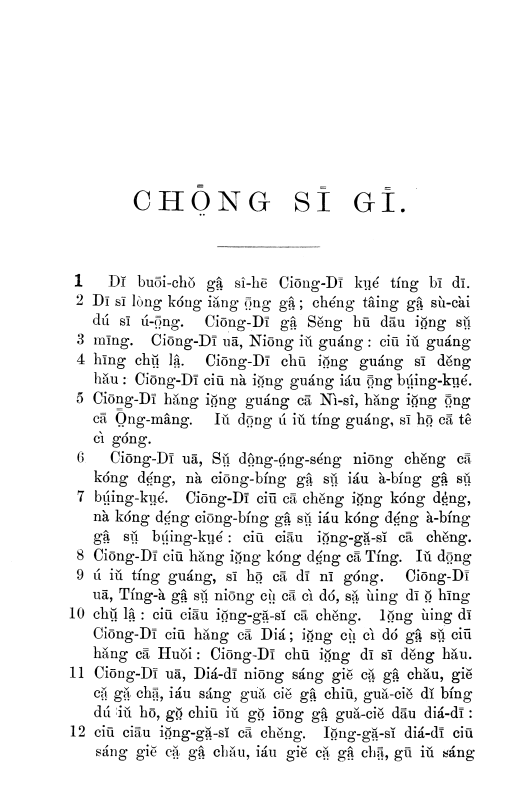
Bible in Jian'ou Romanised (Genesis), published by the British and Foreign Bible Society.

The Jian'ou dialect (Northern Min: Gṳ̿ing-é-dī / 建甌事; Chinese: simplified Chinese: 建瓯话; traditional Chinese: 建甌話; pinyin: Jiàn'ōuhuà), also known as Kienow dialect, is a local dialect of Northern Min Chinese spoken in Jian'ou in northern Fujian province. It is regarded as the standard common language in Jian'ou.

== Phonetics and phonology ==
According to The Eight Tones of Kien-chou (建州八音), a rime dictionary published in 1795, the Jian'ou dialect had 15 initials, 34 rimes and 7 tones in the 18th century, however there are only 6 tones in the modern dialect as the "light level" (陽平) tone has disappeared.

=== Initials ===
Initials of the Jian'ou dialect
| | | Bilabial | Alveolar | Velar | Glottal |
|---|---|---|---|---|---|
| Nasal | | m | n | ŋ | |
| Plosive | voiceless unaspirated | p | t | k | ʔ |
| Plosive | voiceless aspirated | pʰ | tʰ | kʰ | |
| Affricate | voiceless unaspirated | | ts | | |
| Affricate | voiceless aspirated | | tsʰ | | |
| Fricative | | | s | x | |
| Approximant | | | l | | |

=== Rimes ===
Rimes of the Jian'ou dialect
| | Open syllable | | | | | | | | | | Nasal coda | | | | | |
|---|---|---|---|---|---|---|---|---|---|---|---|---|---|---|---|---|
| Open mouth | | a | e | ɛ | œ | ɔ | o | ai | au | | | aŋ | aiŋ | eiŋ | œyŋ | ɔŋ |
| Even mouth | i | ia | | iɛ | | iɔ | | | iau | iu | iŋ | iaŋ | | ieiŋ | | iɔŋ |
| Closed mouth | u | ua | | uɛ | | | | uai | | | uiŋ | uaŋ | uaiŋ | | | uɔŋ |
| Round mouth | y | | | yɛ | | | | | | | yiŋ | | | | | |

=== Tones ===
Jian'ou has four tones, which are reduced to two in checked syllables.

Tone chart of the Jian'ou dialect
| Tone number | Tone name | Tone contour |
|---|---|---|
| 1 | level (平聲) | ˥˦ (54) or ˥ (5) |
| 2 | rising (上聲) | ˨˩ (21) or ˩ (1) |
| 3 | dark departing (陰去) | ˧ (3) |
| 4 | light departing (陽去) | ˦ (4) |
| 5 | dark entering (陰入) | ˨˦ (24) |
| 6 | light entering (陽入) | ˦˨ (42) |

The entering tones in the Jian'ou dialect do not have any entering tone coda (入聲韻尾) such as /-ʔ/, /-p̚/, /-t̚/ and /-k̚/ which makes it distinct from many other Chinese varieties.

== Sources ==
- Beijing daxue Zhongguo yuyan wenxue xi yuyanxue jiaoyanshi 北京大學中國語言文學系語言學教研室 (1989). Hànyǔ fāngyīn zìhuì 漢語方音字匯 (in Chinese). Beijing: Wenzi gaige chubanshe.
- Yuan, Jiahua 袁家驊 (1989). Hànyǔ fāngyán gàiyào 漢語方言概要 [An Introduction to Chinese Dialects] (in Chinese). Beijing: Wenzi gaige chubanshe.
- Jianou Xian difangzhi bianzuan weiyuanhui 建瓯县地方志编纂委员会 (1994). Jiànōu xiànzhì 建瓯县志 [Chorography of Jian'ou County]. Vol. 36. Beijing: Zhonghua shuju. ISBN 7-101-01283-3. Archived from the original on 2018-04-07.
- Lien, Chinfa (1990). "Competing Final Systems in the Jian'ou Dialect" (PDF). Tsing Hua Journal of Chinese Studies. 20 (1): 1–53.
- Norman, Jerry (2002) [1988]. Chinese. Cambridge: Cambridge University Press. ISBN 0-521-29653-6.
