= 2nd millennium BC =

Millennium between 2000 BC and 1001 BC

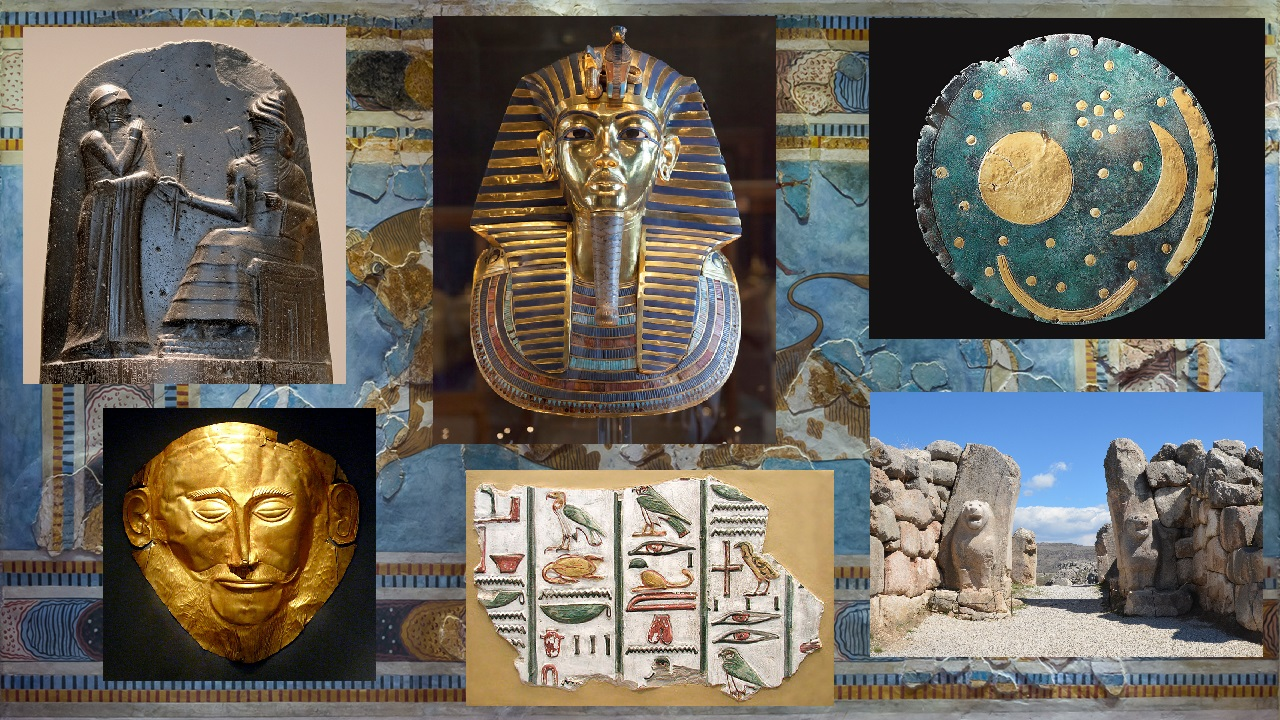
From top left clockwise: Hammurabi, Babylonian king, best known for his code of laws; The gold funerary mask of Tutankhamun has become a symbol of ancient Egyptian civilization and its enduring legacy; Nebra sky disc is considered the oldest concrete representation of astronomical phenomena, such as the Sun, Moon, and stars; The Lion Gate of Hattusa is a testament to the architectural and artistic skills of the Hittites; Hieroglyphs from the tomb of Seti I; Mask of Agamemnon (Background: Bull-Leaping Fresco ca. 1450-1400 BC).

The 2nd millennium BC spanned the years 2000 BC to 1001 BC. In the Ancient Near East, it marks the transition from the Middle to the Late Bronze Age. The Ancient Near Eastern cultures are well within the historical era: The first half of the millennium is dominated by the Middle Kingdom of Egypt and Babylonia. The alphabet develops. At the center of the millennium, a new order emerges with Mycenaean Greek dominance of the Aegean and the rise of the Hittite Empire. The end of the millennium sees the Bronze Age collapse and the transition to the Iron Age.

Other regions of the world are still in the prehistoric period. In Europe, the Beaker culture introduces the Bronze Age, presumably associated with Indo-European expansion. The Indo-Iranian expansion reaches the Iranian plateau and onto the Indian subcontinent (Vedic India), propagating the use of the chariot. Mesoamerica enters the Pre-Classic (Olmec) period. North America is in the late Archaic stage. In Maritime Southeast Asia, the Austronesian expansion reaches Micronesia. In Sub-Saharan Africa, the Bantu expansion begins.

World population rose steadily, possibly surpassing the 100 million mark for the first time.

== The world in the 2nd millennium BC ==
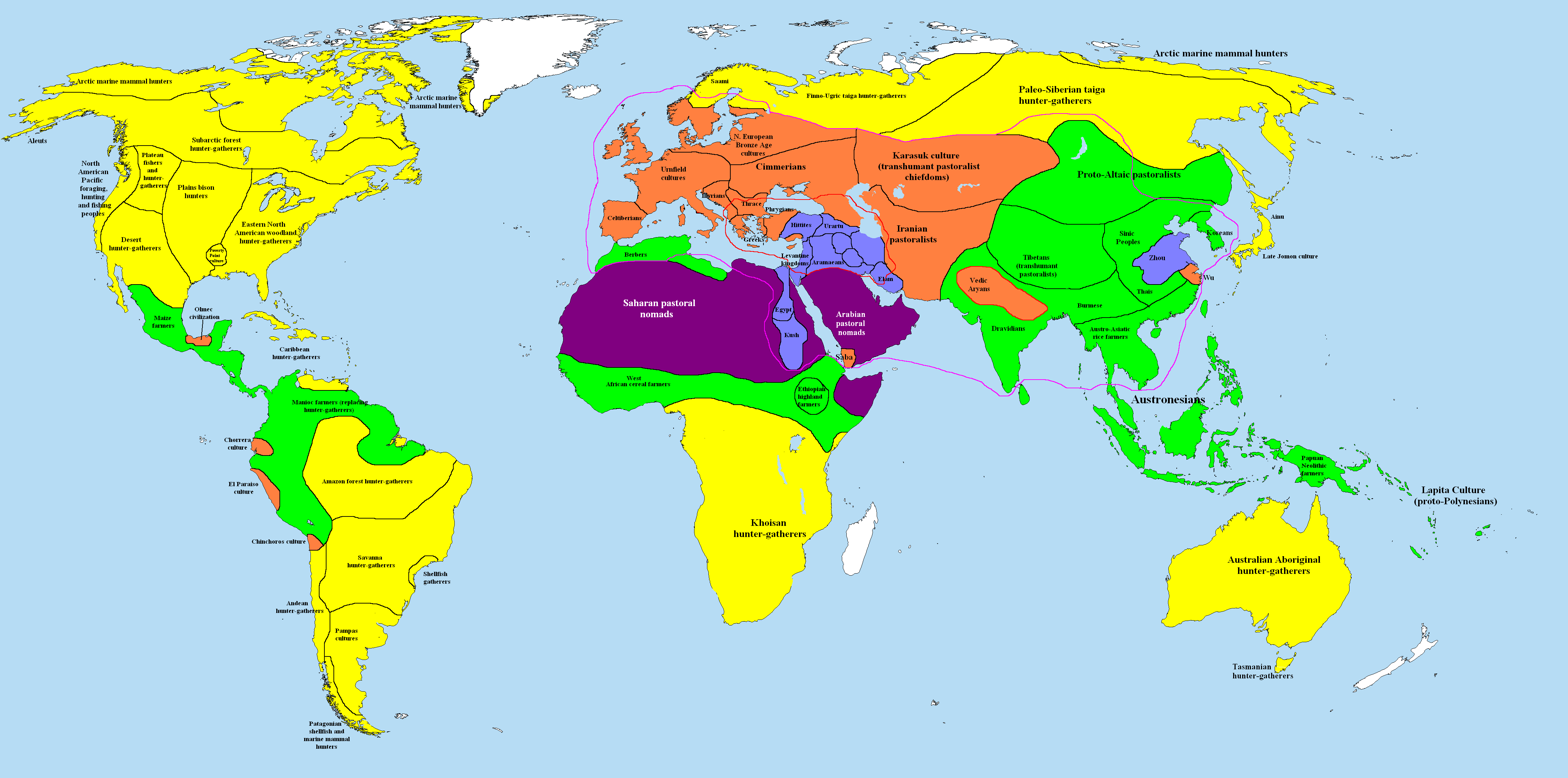
Overview map of the world at the end of the 2nd millennium BC, color-coded by cultural stage: Palaeolithic or Mesolithic hunter-gatherers nomadic pastoralists simple farming societies complex farming societies (Old World Bronze Age, Olmecs, Andes) state societies (Fertile Crescent, China)

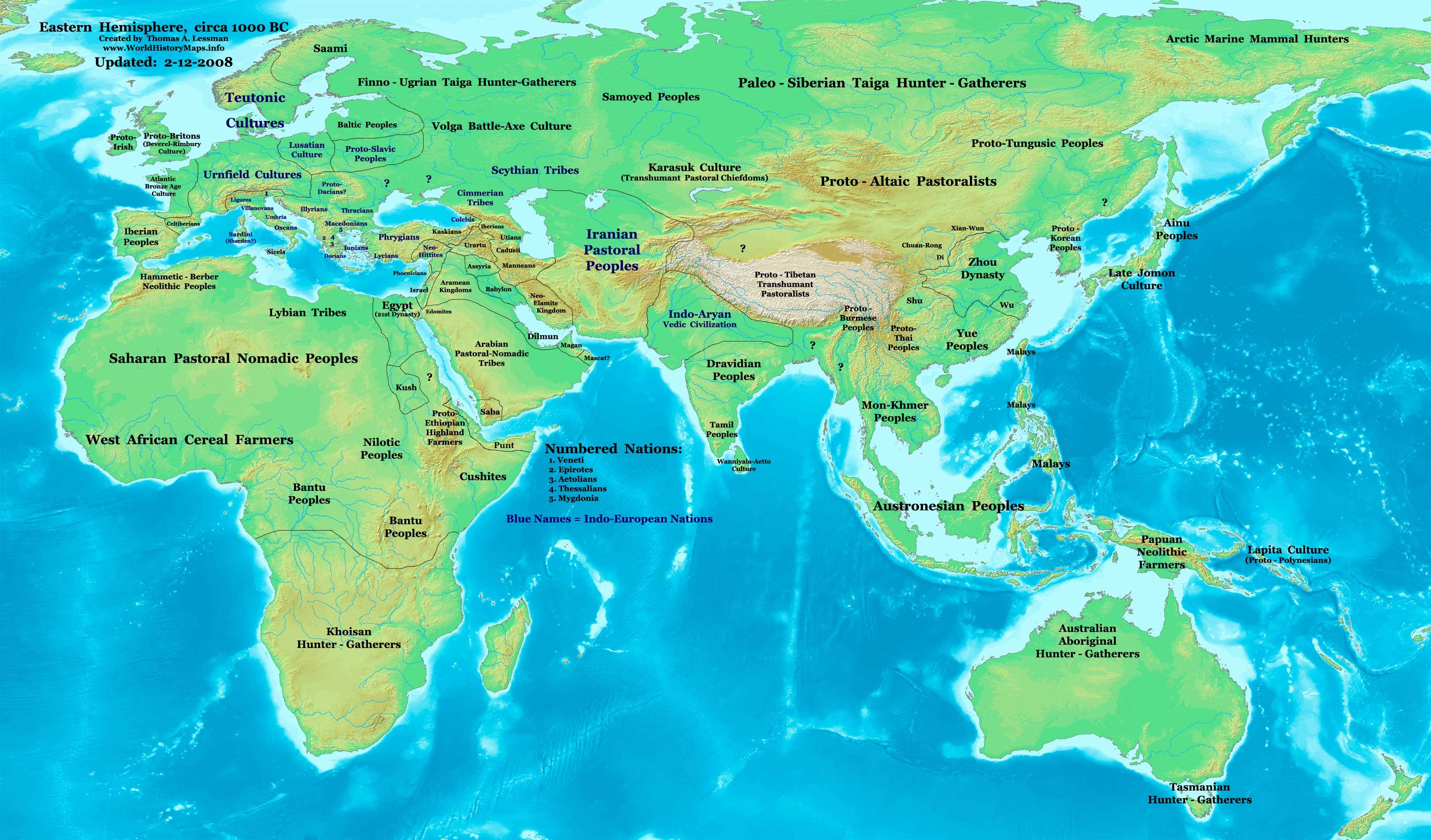
Map of the Eastern Hemisphere in 1000 BC, just after the end of the 2nd millennium BC.

== History ==
See the article on chronology of the ancient Near East for a discussion regarding the accuracy and resolution of dates for events of the 2nd millennium BC in the Near East.

=== Middle Bronze Age ===
Spending much of their energies in trying to recuperate from the chaotic situation that existed at the turn of the millennium, the most powerful civilizations of the time, Egypt and Mesopotamia, turned their attention to more modest goals. The Pharaohs of the Middle Kingdom of Egypt and their contemporary Kings of Babylon, of Amorite origin, brought governance that was largely popular and approved of among their subjects, and favoured elegant art and architecture. Farther east, the Indus Valley Civilization was in a period of decline, possibly as a result of intense, ruinous flooding.

Egypt and Babylonia's military tactics were still based on foot soldiers transporting their equipment on donkeys. Combined with a weak economy and difficulty in maintaining order, this was a fragile situation that crumbled under the pressure of external forces they could not oppose.

==== Unrest of the 16th century ====
About a century before the middle of the millennium, bands of Indo-European invaders came from the Central Asian plains and swept through Western Asia and Northeast Africa. They were riding fast two-wheeled chariots powered by horses, a system of weaponry developed earlier in the context of plains warfare. This tool of war was unknown among the classical civilizations. Egypt and Babylonia's foot soldiers were unable to defend against the invaders: in 1630 BC, the Hyksos swept into the Nile Delta, and in 1595 BC, the Hittites swept into Mesopotamia.

=== Late Bronze Age ===
The people in place were quick to adapt to the new tactics, and a new international situation resulted from the change. Though during most of the second half of the 2nd millennium BC several regional powers competed relentlessly for hegemony, many developments occurred: there was new emphasis on grandiose architecture, new clothing fashions, vivid diplomatic correspondence on clay tablets, renewed economic exchanges, and the New Kingdom of Egypt played the role of the main superpower. Among the great states of the time, only Babylon refrained from taking part in battles, mainly due to its new position as the world's religious and intellectual capital.

The Bronze Age civilization at its final period of time, displayed all its characteristic social traits: low level of urbanization, small cities centered on temples or royal palaces, strict separation of classes between an illiterate mass of peasants and craftsmen, and a powerful military elite, knowledge of writing and education reserved to a tiny minority of scribes, and pronounced aristocratic life.

Near the end of the 2nd millennium BC, new waves of barbarians, this time riding on horseback, wholly destroyed the Bronze Age world, and were to be followed by waves of social changes that marked the beginning of different times. Also contributing to the changes were the Sea Peoples, ship-faring raiders of the Mediterranean.

== Empires and dynasties ==
Empires in the Ancient Near East around the end of the 2nd Millennium BC

- Ancient Near East
  - Middle Kingdom of Egypt
  - New Kingdom of Egypt
  - Nubian Kerma culture
  - Old Assyrian Empire
  - Middle Assyrian Empire
  - Elam
  - Hittites Old Kingdom in Anatolia
- Vedic India
  - Kuru kingdom
- Bronze Age China
  - Shang dynasty
  - Zhou dynasty
- Africa
  - Land of Punt

== Prehistoric cultures ==
Europe

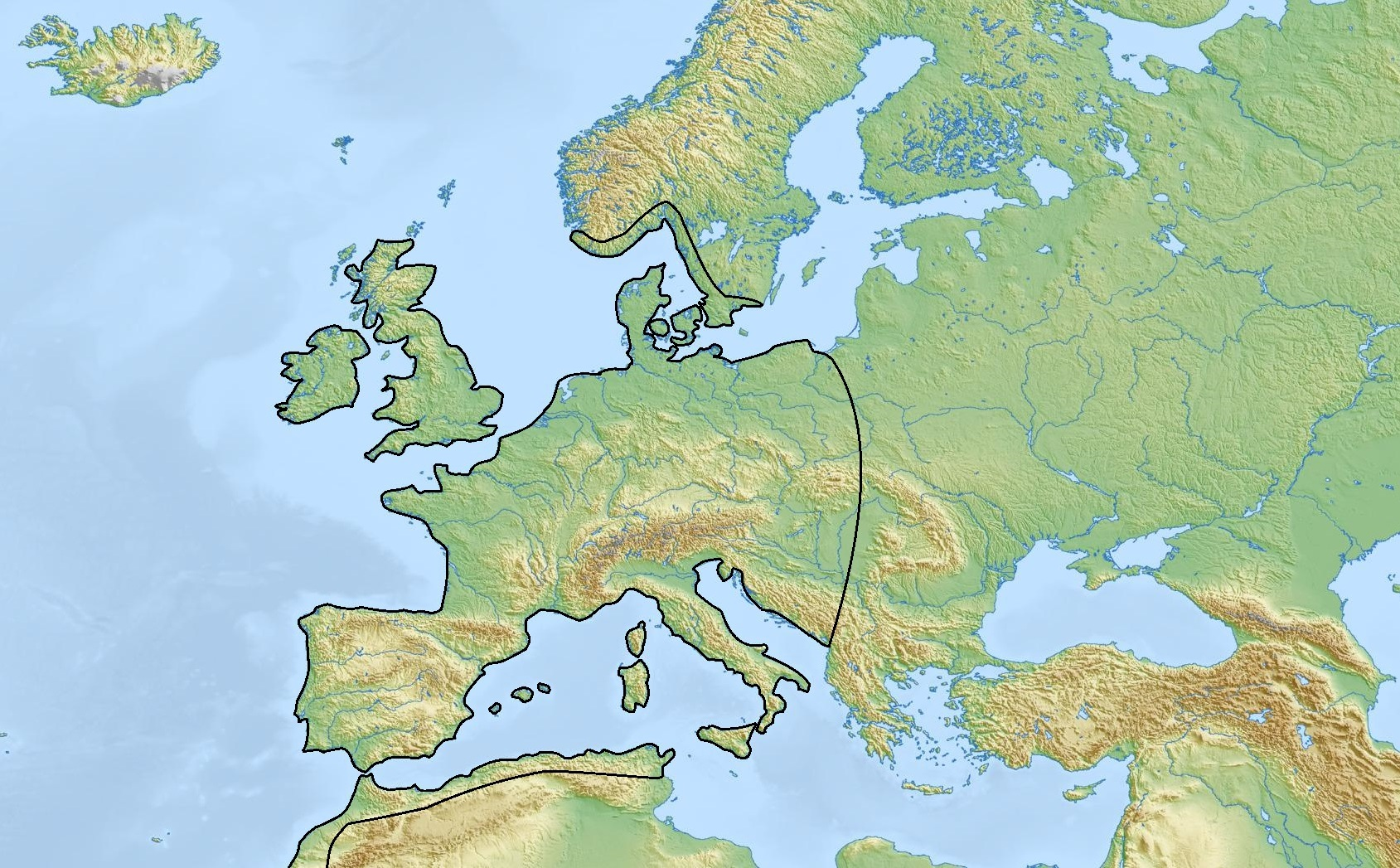
Approximate spread of the Bell Beaker culture in Europe

Europe is still entirely within the prehistoric era; much of Europe enters the Bronze Age early in the 2nd millennium.

- Aegean civilization
  - Cycladic culture
  - Helladic period
  - Minoan civilization
  - Mycenaean Greece
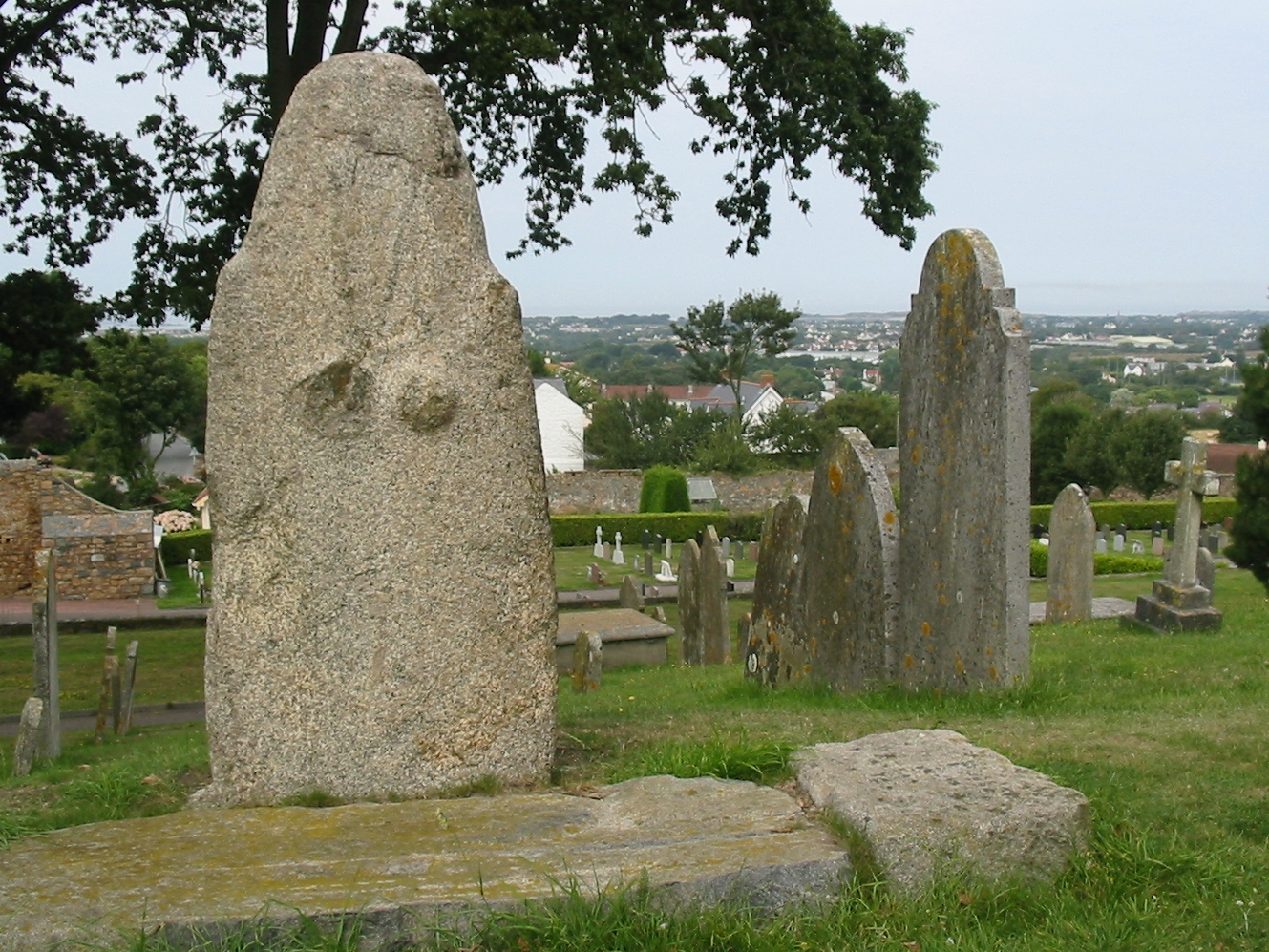
- Women figure of a Menhir, typically dating to the Bronze Age
  Beaker culture
- Terramare culture
- Tumulus culture
- Unetice culture
- Urnfield culture

Central Asia

- Andronovo culture
- Oxus civilization

East Asia

Approximate spread of the Erlitou culture in China

- Erlitou culture
- Wucheng culture

South Asia

- Ahar–Banas culture
- Cemetery H culture
- Indus Valley Civilization
- Jorwe culture
- Malwa culture
- Ochre Coloured Pottery culture

Americas

- Olmec

Sub-Saharan Africa

The desiccation of the Sahara is complete. Neolithisation of Sub-Saharan Africa is initiated via expansion from the dried Sahara, reaching West and East Africa. Later in the 2nd millennium, pastoralism and iron metallurgy spread to Central Africa via the Bantu migration.

- Kerma culture
- Savanna Pastoral Neolithic
- Nok culture

== Events ==
Volcano eruption at Thera, c. 1500 BC. Thera today

- c. 2000 BC – Seima-Turbino Phenomenon.
- c. 1700–1300 BC – Palace complex in Knossos, Crete, was built.
- c. 1700 BC earthquake damages palaces at Knossos and Phaistos.
- 1627 BC – Minoan eruption.
- c. 1600 BC–1360 BC – Egyptian domination over Canaan and Syria.
- c. 1575 BC – Nubian Kerma sacks Egypt.
- c. 1500 BC – Volcanic eruption at Thera.
- c. 1500 BC – Meteorite impact that formed the Kaali crater in Estonia.
- c. 1500 BC – Bantu expansion across central, eastern and southern Africa.
- 1520 BC – Egypt conquers Nubia.
- 1478 BC – Battle of Megiddo between Ancient Egyptians and the Canaanites.
- 1269 BC – Ramses II and Hattusilis III sign peace treaty.
- 1274 BC – Battle of Kadesh between Ancient Egyptians and Hittites.
- c. 1250 BC – destruction of Troy VII.
- 1045 BC – Zhou dynasty founded in China.

== Inventions, discoveries, introductions ==
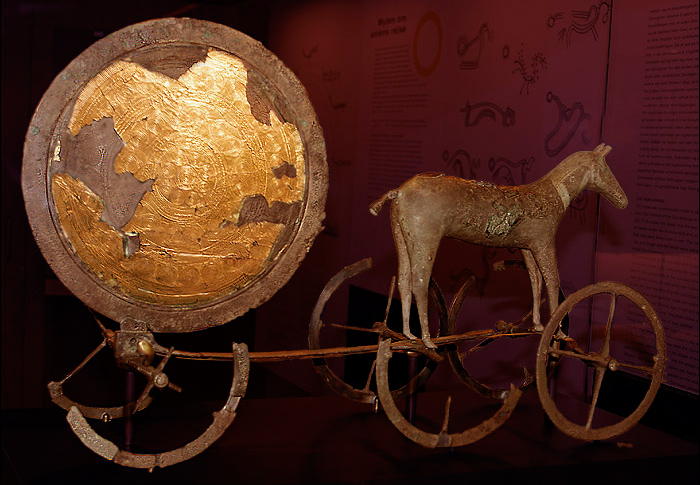
The gilded side of the Trundholm sun chariot.

- Chinese Oracle bone script.
- Tumble polishing: Indians invented polishing method in the 10th century BC.
- Diamond drills: in the 12th century BC or 7th century BC, Indians not only innovated use of diamond tipped drills but also invented double diamond tipped drills for bead manufacturing.
- Phoenician alphabet.
- Nebra sky disk, oldest known visual representation of the cosmos.
- Discovery of new iron smelting and smithing techniques.
- Spoke-wheeled chariots.
- Oldest known trousers from a grave in Turpan, western China.

== Languages ==
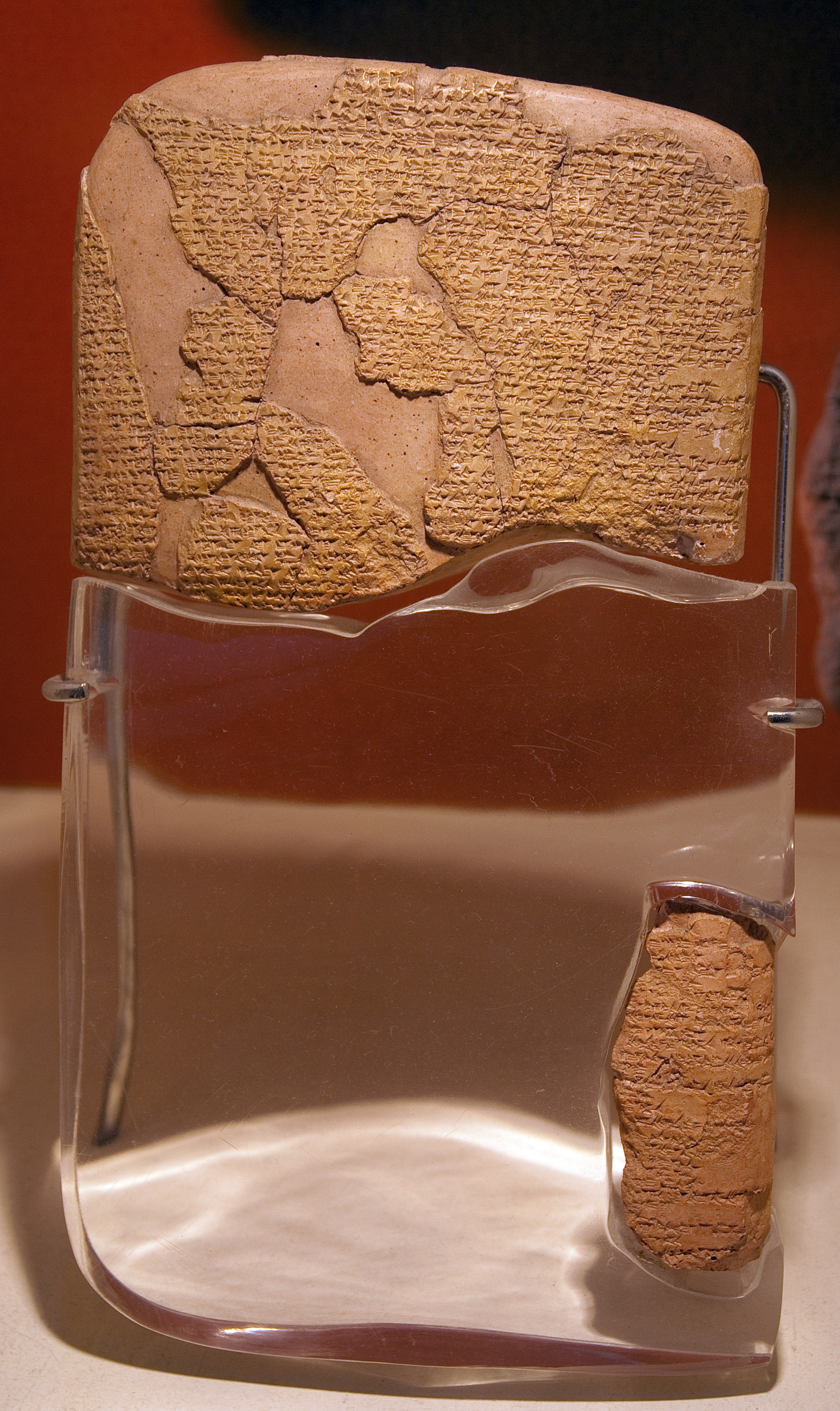
The Kadesh peace agreement—on display at the Istanbul Archaeology Museum—is believed to be the earliest international agreement

In the history of the Egyptian language, the early 2nd millennium saw a transition from Old Egyptian to Middle Egyptian. As the most used written form of the Ancient Egyptian language, it is frequently (incorrectly) referred to simply as "Hieroglyphics".

The earliest attested Indo-European language, the Hittite language, first appears in cuneiform in the 16th century BC (Anitta text), before disappearing from records in the 13th century BC. Hittite is the best known and the most studied language of the extinct Anatolian branch of Indo-European languages.

The first Northwest Semitic language, Ugaritic, is attested in the 14th century BC. The first fully phonemic script Proto-Canaanite developed from Egyptian hieroglyphs, becoming the Phoenician alphabet by 1200 BC. The Phoenician alphabet was spread throughout the Mediterranean by Phoenician maritime traders and became one of the most widely used writing systems in the world, and the parent of virtually all alphabetic writing systems. The Phoenician language is also the first Canaanite language, the Northwest Semitic languages spoken by the ancient peoples of the Canaan region: the Israelites, Phoenicians, Amorites, Ammonites, Moabites and Edomites.

Mycenaean Greek, the most ancient attested form of the Greek language, was used on the Greek mainland, Crete and Cyprus in the Mycenaean period.

== Centuries and decades ==
20th century BC	1990s BC	1980s BC	1970s BC	1960s BC	1950s BC	1940s BC	1930s BC	1920s BC	1910s BC	1900s BC
19th century BC	1890s BC	1880s BC	1870s BC	1860s BC	1850s BC	1840s BC	1830s BC	1820s BC	1810s BC	1800s BC
18th century BC	1790s BC	1780s BC	1770s BC	1760s BC	1750s BC	1740s BC	1730s BC	1720s BC	1710s BC	1700s BC
17th century BC	1690s BC	1680s BC	1670s BC	1660s BC	1650s BC	1640s BC	1630s BC	1620s BC	1610s BC	1600s BC
16th century BC	1590s BC	1580s BC	1570s BC	1560s BC	1550s BC	1540s BC	1530s BC	1520s BC	1510s BC	1500s BC
15th century BC	1490s BC	1480s BC	1470s BC	1460s BC	1450s BC	1440s BC	1430s BC	1420s BC	1410s BC	1400s BC
14th century BC	1390s BC	1380s BC	1370s BC	1360s BC	1350s BC	1340s BC	1330s BC	1320s BC	1310s BC	1300s BC
13th century BC	1290s BC	1280s BC	1270s BC	1260s BC	1250s BC	1240s BC	1230s BC	1220s BC	1210s BC	1200s BC
12th century BC	1190s BC	1180s BC	1170s BC	1160s BC	1150s BC	1140s BC	1130s BC	1120s BC	1110s BC	1100s BC
11th century BC	1090s BC	1080s BC	1070s BC	1060s BC	1050s BC	1040s BC	1030s BC	1020s BC	1010s BC	1000s BC
