= List of decades, centuries, and millennia =

The list below includes links to articles with further details for each millennium, century and decade from 15,000 BC to AD 3000.

== Millennia ==
15th millennium BC	15,000–14,001 BC
14th millennium BC	14,000–13,001 BC
13th millennium BC	13,000–12,001 BC
12th millennium BC	12,000–11,001 BC
11th millennium BC	11,000–10,001 BC
10th millennium BC	10,000–9001 BC
9th millennium BC	9000–8001 BC
8th millennium BC	8000–7001 BC
7th millennium BC	7000–6001 BC
6th millennium BC	6000–5001 BC
5th millennium BC	5000–4001 BC
4th millennium BC	4000–3001 BC
3rd millennium BC	3000–2001 BC
2nd millennium BC	2000–1001 BC
1st millennium BC	1000–1 BC
1st millennium	AD 1–1000
2nd millennium	AD 1001–2000
3rd millennium	AD 2001–3000

== Centuries and decades ==
3rd millennium BC—3000–2001 BC
30th century BC
29th century BC
28th century BC
27th century BC
26th century BC
25th century BC
24th century BC
23rd century BC
22nd century BC
21st century BC
2nd millennium BC—2000–1001 BC
20th century BC
19th century BC
18th century BC
17th century BC	1690s BC	1680s BC	1670s BC	1660s BC	1650s BC	1640s BC	1630s BC	1620s BC	1610s BC	1600s BC
16th century BC	1590s BC	1580s BC	1570s BC	1560s BC	1550s BC	1540s BC	1530s BC	1520s BC	1510s BC	1500s BC
15th century BC	1490s BC	1480s BC	1470s BC	1460s BC	1450s BC	1440s BC	1430s BC	1420s BC	1410s BC	1400s BC
14th century BC	1390s BC	1380s BC	1370s BC	1360s BC	1350s BC	1340s BC	1330s BC	1320s BC	1310s BC	1300s BC
13th century BC	1290s BC	1280s BC	1270s BC	1260s BC	1250s BC	1240s BC	1230s BC	1220s BC	1210s BC	1200s BC
12th century BC	1190s BC	1180s BC	1170s BC	1160s BC	1150s BC	1140s BC	1130s BC	1120s BC	1110s BC	1100s BC
11th century BC	1090s BC	1080s BC	1070s BC	1060s BC	1050s BC	1040s BC	1030s BC	1020s BC	1010s BC	1000s BC
1st millennium BC—1000–1 BC
10th century BC	990s BC	980s BC	970s BC	960s BC	950s BC	940s BC	930s BC	920s BC	910s BC	900s BC
9th century BC	890s BC	880s BC	870s BC	860s BC	850s BC	840s BC	830s BC	820s BC	810s BC	800s BC
8th century BC	790s BC	780s BC	770s BC	760s BC	750s BC	740s BC	730s BC	720s BC	710s BC	700s BC
7th century BC	690s BC	680s BC	670s BC	660s BC	650s BC	640s BC	630s BC	620s BC	610s BC	600s BC
6th century BC	590s BC	580s BC	570s BC	560s BC	550s BC	540s BC	530s BC	520s BC	510s BC	500s BC
5th century BC	490s BC	480s BC	470s BC	460s BC	450s BC	440s BC	430s BC	420s BC	410s BC	400s BC
4th century BC	390s BC	380s BC	370s BC	360s BC	350s BC	340s BC	330s BC	320s BC	310s BC	300s BC
3rd century BC	290s BC	280s BC	270s BC	260s BC	250s BC	240s BC	230s BC	220s BC	210s BC	200s BC
2nd century BC	190s BC	180s BC	170s BC	160s BC	150s BC	140s BC	130s BC	120s BC	110s BC	100s BC
1st century BC	90s BC	80s BC	70s BC	60s BC	50s BC	40s BC	30s BC	20s BC	10s BC	0s BC (Note: The 0s BC and AD are not true decades, as each contains only nine years.)
1st millennium—AD 1–1000
1st century	0s	10s	20s	30s	40s	50s	60s	70s	80s	90s
2nd century	100s	110s	120s	130s	140s	150s	160s	170s	180s	190s
3rd century	200s	210s	220s	230s	240s	250s	260s	270s	280s	290s
4th century	300s	310s	320s	330s	340s	350s	360s	370s	380s	390s
5th century	400s	410s	420s	430s	440s	450s	460s	470s	480s	490s
6th century	500s	510s	520s	530s	540s	550s	560s	570s	580s	590s
7th century	600s	610s	620s	630s	640s	650s	660s	670s	680s	690s
8th century	700s	710s	720s	730s	740s	750s	760s	770s	780s	790s
9th century	800s	810s	820s	830s	840s	850s	860s	870s	880s	890s
10th century	900s	910s	920s	930s	940s	950s	960s	970s	980s	990s
2nd millennium—AD 1001–2000
11th century	1000s	1010s	1020s	1030s	1040s	1050s	1060s	1070s	1080s	1090s
12th century	1100s	1110s	1120s	1130s	1140s	1150s	1160s	1170s	1180s	1190s
13th century	1200s	1210s	1220s	1230s	1240s	1250s	1260s	1270s	1280s	1290s
14th century	1300s	1310s	1320s	1330s	1340s	1350s	1360s	1370s	1380s	1390s
15th century	1400s	1410s	1420s	1430s	1440s	1450s	1460s	1470s	1480s	1490s
16th century	1500s	1510s	1520s	1530s	1540s	1550s	1560s	1570s	1580s	1590s
17th century	1600s	1610s	1620s	1630s	1640s	1650s	1660s	1670s	1680s	1690s
18th century	1700s	1710s	1720s	1730s	1740s	1750s	1760s	1770s	1780s	1790s
19th century	1800s	1810s	1820s	1830s	1840s	1850s	1860s	1870s	1880s	1890s
20th century	1900s	1910s	1920s	1930s	1940s	1950s	1960s	1970s	1980s	1990s
3rd millennium—AD 2001–3000
21st century	2000s	2010s	2020s	2030s	2040s	2050s	2060s	2070s	2080s	2090s
22nd century
23rd century
24th century
25th century
26th century
27th century
28th century
29th century
30th century

== See also ==
- Lists of years by topic
- List of timelines
- Chronology
- See calendar and list of calendars for other groupings of years
- See history, human history and periodization for different organizations of historical events
- For earlier time periods beyond the Earth, see:
  - Timeline of the universe
  - Chronology of the universe
- For earlier time periods on the Earth, see:
  - Geologic time scale
  - Timeline of the evolutionary history of life
  - Timeline of prehistory
  - Timelines of world history
- For future time periods, see:
  - Timeline of the far future, events beyond the year 3000
  - List of future astronomical events, predicted astronomical events
