= September 1968 =

Month of 1968

<<	September 1968					>>
Su	Mo	Tu	We	Th	Fr	Sa
1	2	3	4	5	6	7
8	9	10	11	12	13	14
15	16	17	18	19	20	21
22	23	24	25	26	27	28
29	30

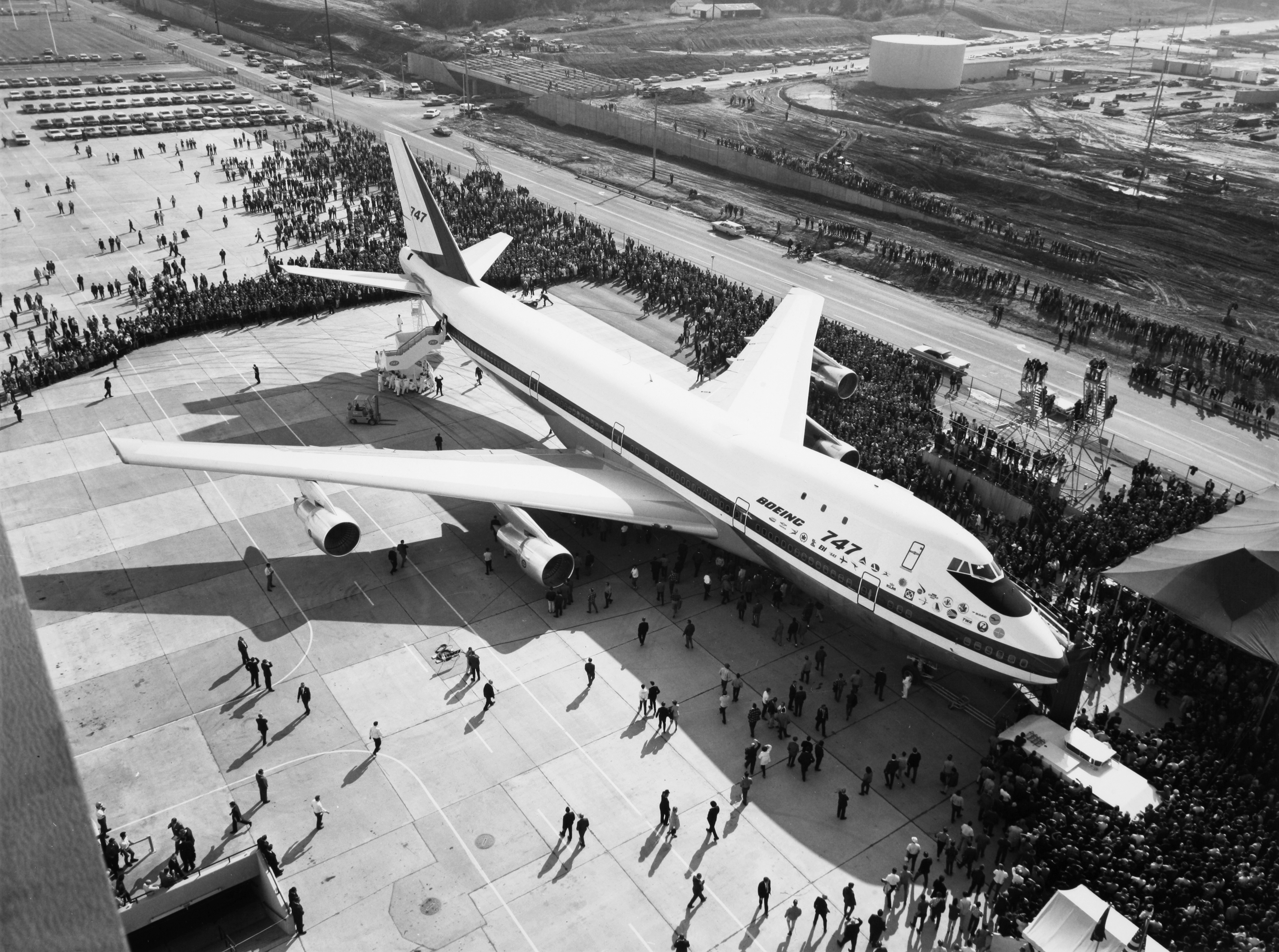
September 30, 1968: The Boeing 747 is introduced to the public

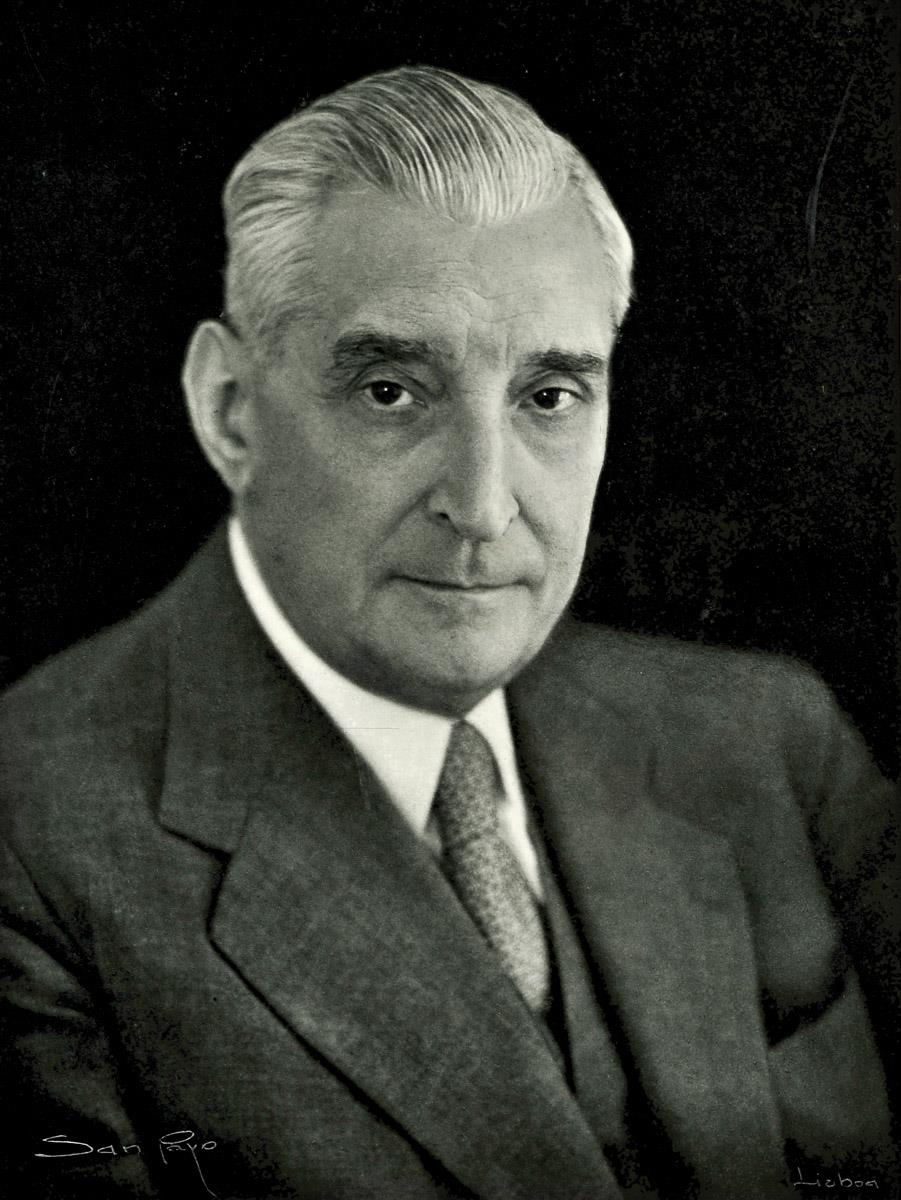
September 27, 1968: Longtime Portuguese dictator Salazar removed from office while in temporary coma

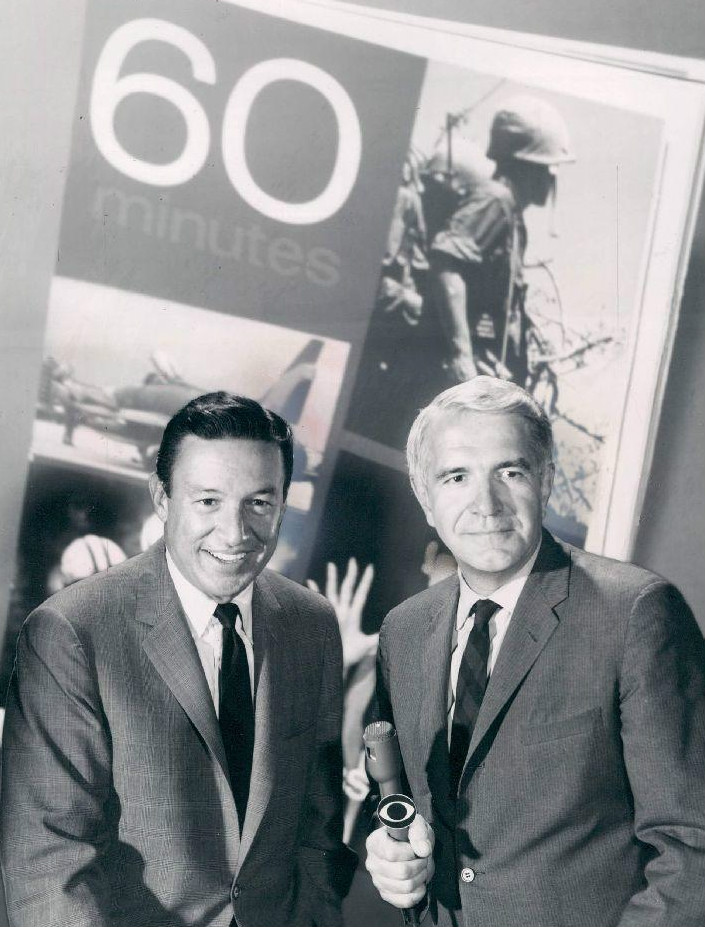
September 24, 1968: 60 Minutes debuts with Mike Wallace and Harry Reasoner

September 6, 1968: Kingdom of Swaziland granted independence

The following events occurred in September 1968:

== September 1, 1968 (Sunday) ==
- In the first reforms after the August 20 invasion by the Soviet Union and the Warsaw Pact, the Czechoslovak Communist Party more than doubled its Central Committee from 87 members to 194, and increased its Presidium from 11 members to 21. Party First Secretary Alexander Dubček, Premier Oldřich Černík, and National Assembly President Josef Smrkovsky, who had all been arrested after the invasion and held prisoner in the Soviet Union, were elected to the new Presidium and retained their positions.
- Austria received its first deliveries of natural gas from the Soviet Union with the opening of a pipeline across the Czechoslovak border with Austria, fulfilling a June 1 agreement as the first Western European country to agree to a long term purchase of Soviet energy resources.
- Born: Mohamed Atta, Egyptian-born terrorist who led the hijacking of American Airlines Flight 11 and destroyed the North Tower of the World Trade Center during the September 11 attacks, killing himself and 1,493 people on that day; in Kafr el-Sheikh, United Arab Republic (now Egypt)

== September 2, 1968 (Monday) ==
- The Bimini Road, an underwater rock formation composed of large, rectangular limestone blocks in an almost straight line that runs for 0.5 miles (0.80 km), was discovered by three divers off of the coast of the North Bimini island in the Bahamas.

== September 3, 1968 (Tuesday) ==
- António de Oliveira Salazar, the 79-year-old Prime Minister of Portugal and that nation's dictator since 1932, was seriously injured at his beach resort home in Estoril when the deck chair he was sitting in collapsed and his head struck the floor. Salazar had a cerebral hemorrhage and, by Friday, was showing signs of a stroke. He went into a coma and would be replaced on September 27.
- The crash of a Bulgarian airliner killed 42 of the 82 passengers on board, and all but two members of the crew of five, while attempting to land at Bourgas on a flight from Dresden in East Germany. Most of the people on board were East German tourists who were on their way to a vacation at the Black Sea resort.
- Sir Leonard Williams, who had recently been knighted after retiring as the general secretary of Britain's Labour Party, took office as the second Governor-General of Mauritius, replacing Sir John Rennie.
- Died: Juan José Castro, 73, Argentinian classical composer and conductor

== September 4, 1968 (Wednesday) ==
- Alphonse Massamba-Débat was forced to resign from his position as President of the Republic of the Congo, one month after relinquishing most of his power to the National Revolutionary Council following an August 4 coup. The Prime Minister, Congo Army Captain Alfred Raoul, was named as the acting President but would yield a few months later to the Council leader, Captain Marien Ngouabi, on January 1, 1969. Massamba-Debat would be executed on March 25, 1977, a week after Ngouabi's assassination.
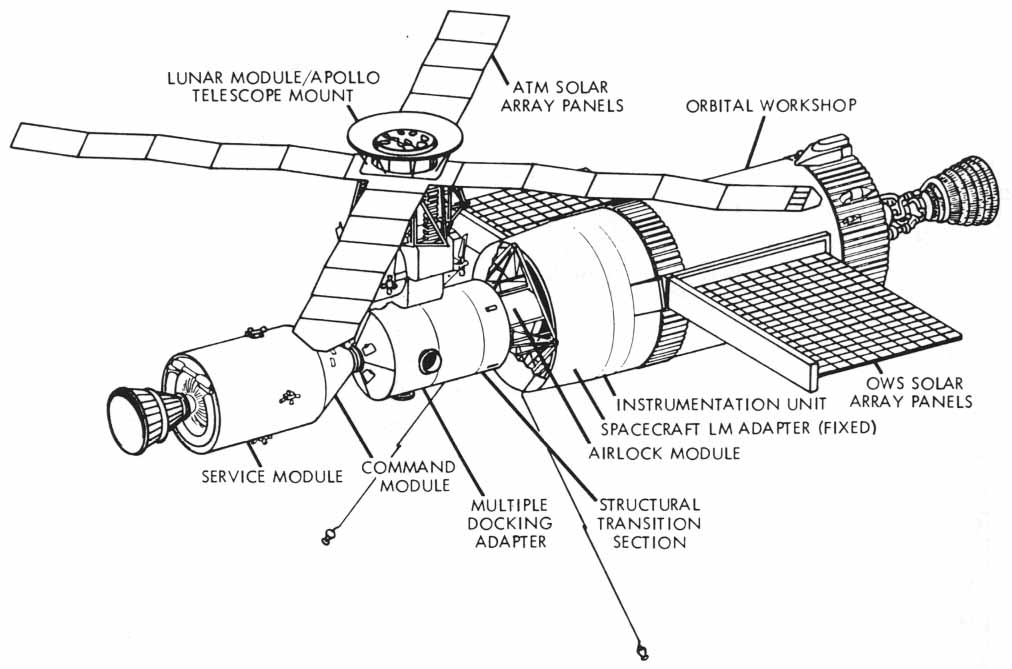
  The AAP cluster as visualized by personnel of NASA's Office of Manned Space Flight in Washington in September 1968
- Wernher von Braun, Director of NASA's Marshall Space Flight Center (MSFC), ordered the first full test of the new pressure suits to be worn on Apollo missions. The test, made in the Neutral Buoyancy Simulator at the Saturn I workshop, showed that upgraded seals were "very good", but von Braun recommended additional handholds and tether points.
- Born:
  - Mike Piazza, American Major League Baseball player and inductee of the Baseball Hall of Fame, known for hitting 427 home runs in his 16-season career; in Norristown, Pennsylvania
  - John DiMaggio, American voice actor; in North Plainfield, New Jersey

== September 5, 1968 (Thursday) ==
- To preserve its monopoly on the American telephone system, the AT&T Corporation introduced a small device that CEO H. I. Romnes called the "protective coupling arrangement" (PCA). On June 26, the Carterfone decision had been issued by the U.S. Federal Communications Commission allowing other companies to connect directly to the AT&T telephone network. AT&T then changed the electronic signals required for access; customers would be able to connect non-AT&T devices (such as modems or facsimile machines) to the AT&T network, but only if they paid a monthly lease for the PCA that could transmit the required electronic signal. In displaying the device and announcing the new policy to AT&T executives, Romnes said "We welcome competition... the more, the merrier... our intent is to make interfaces as simple and inexpensive as possible."

== September 6, 1968 (Friday) ==
- The Kingdom of Swaziland, a British colony surrounded entirely by South Africa, was granted independence from the United Kingdom. At the time, Swaziland had a population of 400,000 people. Sobhuza II, who had been named the Paramount Chief of the Swazi people as an infant after the death of his father in 1899, and who had been formally enthroned in 1921, was presented with the instruments of independence by the British Secretary of State for Commonwealth Affairs, George Thomson, who appeared on behalf of Queen Elizabeth II.
- Portugal's Prime Minister Salazar underwent emergency brain surgery in Lisbon, three days after striking his head on the floor of his residence when a deck-chair collapsed.
- Died: Dr. Rudolf Schindler, 80, German gastroenterologist who, with Georg Wolf, invented the first semi-flexible gastroscope in 1932

== September 7, 1968 (Saturday) ==
- Two different protests were made against the Miss America beauty pageant in Atlantic City, New Jersey, one against sexism, the other against racism. Activist and author Robin Morgan and 100 members of the feminist organization New York Radical Women organized the "No More Miss America" protest and picketed outside of Convention Hall while the pageant went on inside. Among the events were the crowning of a live sheep (followed by the parade of the ewe, dressed in a bikini and a "Miss America" sash along the famous Atlantic City Boardwalk) and the planned burning of the contents of a "Freedom Trash Can" with high-heeled shoes, women's brassieres, girdles, false eyelashes and copies of magazines like Playboy. A description, by reporter Lindsy Van Gelder and the New York Post of the bonfire plan as the first "bra burning" protest attracted reporters, but an Atlantic City ordinance prohibited the setting of fires on the wooden Boardwalk. The event was one of the first large demonstrations of Second Wave Feminism as the Women's Liberation movement began to attract national media attention.
- On the same day of the protests, Judith Ford of Illinois was crowned as Miss America for 1969 at Convention Hall, but on the same evening, the very first Miss Black America pageant took place at the nearby Ritz Carlton Hotel, initially to call attention to the lack of African American contestants in the pageant and in the state pageants that determined the winners. Saundra Williams of Pennsylvania was crowned hours after Ford won the Miss America title.
- The Banana Splits Adventure Hour began airing on NBC as a collaboration of Sid and Marty Krofft with the Hanna-Barbera Company. Marking the start of a trend in the American television networks away from violent programming to slapstick comedy and music, the show featured four costumed animal characters — Fleegle, Bingo, Drooper and Snork— who played instruments in a rock group. The show would run for 2 seasons, airing its last episode 15 months later on December 13, 1969.
- Geoff Vowden, a forward for Birmingham City F.C., was put into the second half of a soccer football game against Huddersfield Town A.F.C. to replace starter Ron Wylie, and scored three goals in the Blues' 5–1 win over the Terriers, becoming the first substitute player in English Football League history to achieve a hat-trick.
- Born: Marcel Desailly, Ghana-born centre-back and midfielder for the French national soccer football team from 1993 to 2004; in Accra
- Died: Lucio Fontana, 69, Argentine-born Italian painter and sculptor

== September 8, 1968 (Sunday) ==
- After a ceasefire of almost 11 months, the War of Attrition between Egypt and Israel (the period between the 1967 and 1973 wars) erupted into large scale fighting as the Egyptian Army began firing artillery shells against Israeli Defense Force positions on the opposite side of the Suez Canal. Over the course of three weeks, 10 Israeli soldiers were killed and 18 wounded. Israel would retaliate on October 30 with a helicopter raid on two of the Suez Canal bridges and an electricity substation on the Nile River; as a result of the shelling, Israel would fortify its side of the canal and the Bar Lev Line would be completed in March.
- In peace talks in Paris, aimed at negotiating an end to the Vietnam War, U.S. negotiator W. Averell Harriman had his first private meeting with his counterpart from North Vietnam, Le Duc Tho. The two diplomats conferred, along with their interpreters, at the Paris suburb of Vitry-sur-Seine.
- Born:
  - Francisco Martin Duran, American felon who received a 40-year prison sentence after firing 29 rounds of ammunition at the White House on October 29, 1994, in an apparent attempt to assassinate U.S. President Bill Clinton; in Barelas, Albuquerque, New Mexico
  - Louise Minchin, English morning news show host for BBC One; in British Hong Kong

== September 9, 1968 (Monday) ==
- The very first U.S. Open tennis tournament was held, as a successor to the U.S. National Championship, a Grand Slam event that had been limited to amateurs. Virginia Wade defeated Billie Jean King to win the women's singles; both had become professional players earlier in the year. Bob Lutz and Stan Smith, both amateurs, won the men's doubles over the team of Arthur Ashe (amateur) and Andrés Gimeno (pro). Maria Bueno and Margaret Court beat Rosemary Casals and King in the women's doubles; all four were pros.
- Still playing as an amateur, Arthur Ashe, an African-American and a lieutenant in the United States Army, won his first Grand Slam tournament, the US Open, by defeating professional Tom Okker of the Netherlands in the best-of-five finals, 14–12, 5–7, 6–3, 3–6, 6–3. Okker, however, was awarded the $14,000 prize money for the highest finish by a professional because Ashe was ineligible to receive it as an amateur. Ashe would turn professional the following year and would win the Australian Open in 1970 and Wimbledon in 1975.
- The Pryor Mountains Wild Horse Range was established as the first area in the United States set aside as a refuge for mustangs, the American wild horse. The U.S. Department of the Interior designated 39,650 acres (160.5 km^{2}) of isolated mountain terrain (almost 62 square miles) in Montana and Wyoming as a protected area.
- Born: Lila Downs, Grammy Award-winning Mexican singer and multilingual songwriter; in Tlaxiaco

== September 10, 1968 (Tuesday) ==
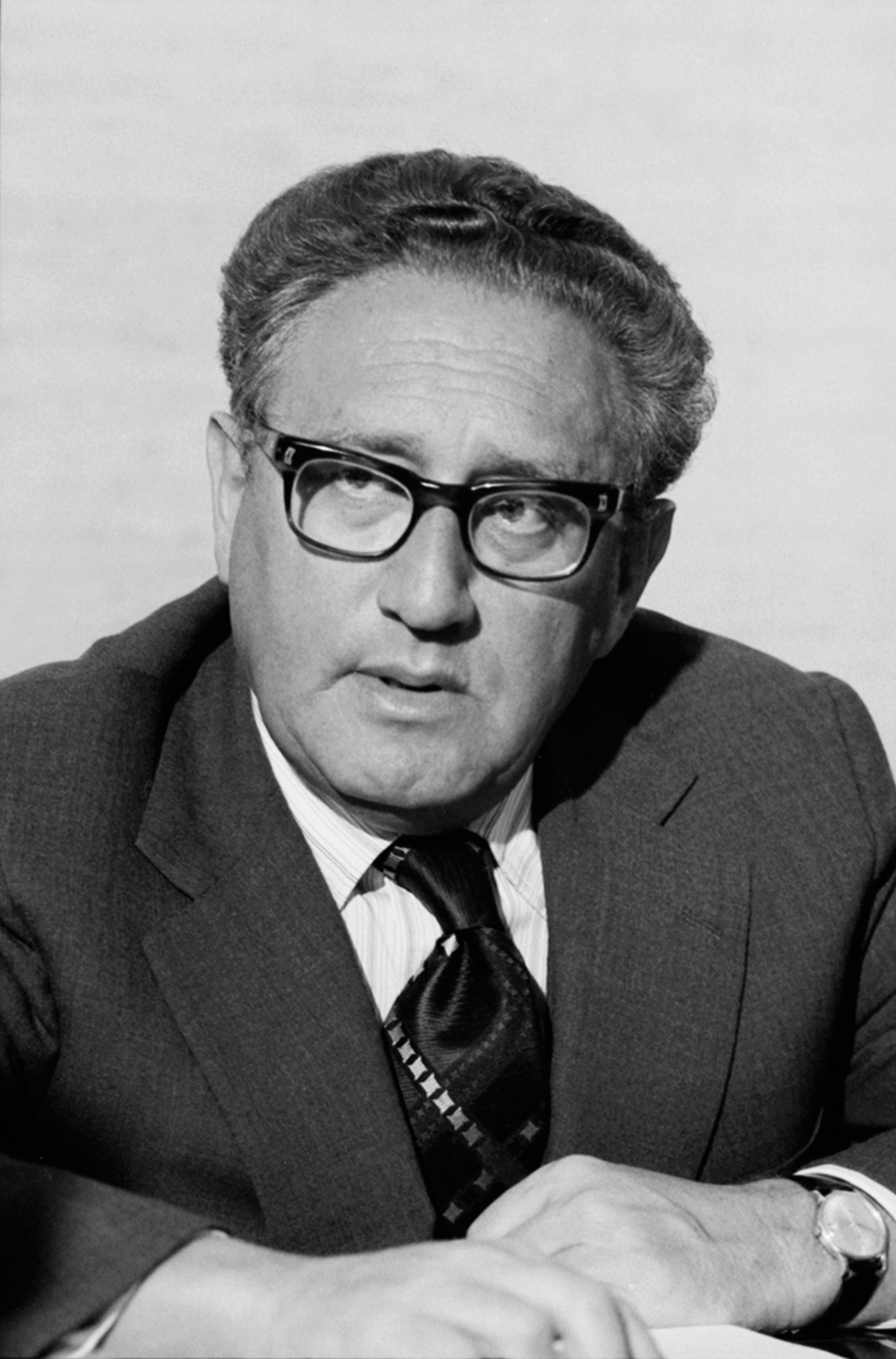
Kissinger

- Harvard University professor Henry Kissinger began his association with Republican presidential nominee Richard Nixon with a telephone call to the Nixon campaign's foreign policy adviser, Richard V. Allen, offering his services that would lead to Kissinger's appointment as President Nixon's National Security Adviser and, later, as the U.S. Secretary of State. According to a 1983 book by investigative journalist Seymour Hersh, The Price of Power: Kissinger in the Nixon White House, Allen recounted later that Kissinger said that he had many friends who were involved in the Paris Peace Talks on behalf of President Lyndon Johnson, and began providing the Nixon campaign with classified information from the talks. In 2016, notes from another Nixon adviser, H. R. Haldeman, would confirm suspicion that Nixon had used Kissinger's information to sabotage the peace talks in the days before the election.
- Maranatha Baptist College began its very first classes, with 173 students and 27 faculty, in Watertown, Wisconsin.
- Born:
  - Big Daddy Kane (stage name for Antonio Hardy), American hip hop artist; in Brooklyn
  - Guy Ritchie, English filmmaker; in Hatfield, Hertfordshire

== September 11, 1968 (Wednesday) ==
- The crash of Air France Flight 1611 killed 95 people, including French Army General René Cogny, when the Sud Aviation Caravelle jet plunged into the Mediterranean Sea during its scheduled approach to Nice, following after departure from the island of Corsica. Before the impact in the sea, 12 miles (19 km) off the coast of the Cap d'Antibes, the pilot radioed that there was a fire on board the jet.
- Convicted Japanese murderer Iwao Hakamata was sentenced to death by hanging, in a ruling by a panel of three judges. After spending more than 45 years on death row, Hakamata would be released on March 27, 2014, and granted a retrial based on evidence of police and prosecutor misconduct.
- The government of India announced its plans to create Meghalaya, a new autonomous territory out of the southwestern hill country of the existing state of Assam, though it would require an amendment to the Indian constitution. Meghalaya would become the 20th state of India in 1972.
- Top military advisor Earle Wheeler advised U.S. President Lyndon Johnson not to halt bombing against military targets over the remaining areas of North Vietnam still under pressure of American bombing.
- Born: Gary "Litefoot" Davis, American actor, rap artist and American Indian activist; in Upland, California
- Died:
  - Tommy Armour, 71, Scottish-born American professional golfer who overcame World War I injuries to become a champion player, winning the U.S. Open in 1927, the PGA Championship in 1930 and the British Open in 1931."Tom Armour Dies— Won U.S., British Opens", AP report in Daily News (New York), September 13, 1968, p.97
  - General René Cogny, 64, retired French Army officer who commanded French forces in Vietnam at the time of the 1954 sacking of Dien Bien Phu, was among the 95 people killed on Flight 1611.

== September 12, 1968 (Thursday) ==
- North Korea allowed foreign journalists to view members of the crew of the USS Pueblo, which had been captured on January 23. U.S. Navy Commander Lloyd M. Bucher and 20 other members of the Pueblo crew of 83 men were displayed at a "press conference" at Pyongyang, although the only person to give answers at the conference was a spokesman for the North Korean government who told reporters what Commander Bucher had allegedly said.
- A team of physicians and designers, led by engineer Robert W. Mann of the Massachusetts Institute of Technology, introduced the "Boston Digital Arm", the first prosthetic limb controlled by a brain–computer interface, wherein the wearer could control the movement of the arm by the electric signals sent by the brain to electronic instruments designed to interpret the signals.

== September 13, 1968 (Friday) ==
- Albania withdrew from the Warsaw Pact three weeks after the Warsaw Pact invasion of Czechoslovakia. The Albanian government had ceased participating in Warsaw Pact maneuvers six years earlier. Enver Hoxha, the premier of Albania, declared that "The Warsaw Treaty no longer serves socialism and peace", Hoxha said, "it no longer serves the cause of the working class and proletarian internationalism, and it has lost the ideological and class basis on which it was created. It now serves the revisionist bourgeoisie, it serves the big-power chauvinistic narrow interests of the Soviet revisionist leadership as well as the U.S.—Soviet counter-revolutionary alliance for the domination of the world."
- In the largest industrial merger in the United Kingdom up to that time, General Electric Company (GEC) acquired the assets of English Electric with the approval of the Industrial Reorganisation Corporation. The acquisition agreement had been signed by GEC and English Electric on September 6.
- A crowd of 300,000 anti-government demonstrators in Mexico City carried out the La Marcha del Silencio— the "Silence March", approaching the National Palace quietly, but ominously, without shouting protest slogans as a show of the marchers' self-discipline and anti-violent aims.
- Born: Bernie Williams, Puerto Rican baseball player, four-time Gold Glove Award winner and 1996 American League Championship Series MVP; in San Juan
- Died: U.S. Army Major General Keith L. Ware, 52, World War II Medal of Honor recipient, was killed along with seven other people when his helicopter was shot down over South Vietnam. He would be posthumously awarded the Distinguished Service Cross.

== September 14, 1968 (Saturday) ==
- The American CBS television network unveiled its lineup of non-violent musical comedies with The Archie Show, bringing the teenage characters from the popular Archie Comics to TV, and giving them instruments to play as a rock band, "The Archies". The new formula of cartoons and pop music was so successful that one of the Archies' recordings that had started on the animated show, "Sugar, Sugar", reached number one on the Billboard Hot 100 of best-selling songs the following year, and would stay there for four weeks.
- With a 5–4 victory over the Oakland A's, Detroit Tigers pitcher Denny McLain won his 30th game of the 1968 season and became the first Major League Baseball pitcher to win 30 games since 1934. Dizzy Dean, the last 30-game winner and former St. Louis Cardinals pitcher, was on hand in Detroit to congratulate McLain's achievement. As of 2025, no other major league pitchers have had 30 wins.

== September 15, 1968 (Sunday) ==
- Baseball's defending World Series champions, the St. Louis Cardinals captured the National League pennant again and earned another trip to the World Series. The first-place Cardinals defeated the last-place Houston Astros, 7–4, while the second-place San Francisco Giants lost to the Cincinnati Reds, 4–0. The combination of the Cards' win and the Giants' loss put San Francisco more than 12 games behind with only 12 games left in the season.
- The Soviet Union launched its Zond 5 rocket from the Baikonur Cosmodrome at 3:42 in the morning local time (2142 UTC on September 14), with "an assortment of living things, such as turtles, worms, and plant seeds." Sources differ as to whether the life forms survived re-entry to Earth's atmosphere on September 21.
- In elections for the lower house of Sweden's Riksdag, Prime Minister Tage Erlander's Social Democratic Party, the Socialdemokraterna, gained 12 seats and an absolute majority (125 of 233) in the Andra kammaren. The next highest vote-getter was Gunnar Hedlund's Centre Party, with 39 seats.

== September 16, 1968 (Monday) ==
- After more than two weeks of criticism for its August 28 decision to not include mixed-race batsman Basil D'Oliveira, one of England's best cricket players, on the England cricket team's tour of South Africa, the Marylebone Cricket Club reversed itself. D'Oliveira, a Cape Coloured man, was a South African native and a naturalized British citizen, and the white-minority government of South Africa prohibited the mixing of races in sporting events as part of its apartheid policy. His inclusion came only after another batsman, Tom Cartwright, was injured in a club match. The next day, South Africa's Prime Minister, B. J. Vorster, canceled England's visit, declaring, "Whereas we are, and always have been, prepared to play host to the Marylebone Cricket Club, we are not prepared to receive a team thrust on us by people whose interests are not the game, but to gain political objectives which they do not even attempt to hide." Vorster denied that he was a racist, or that South Africa put pressure on the English selectors, saying "We behaved very correctly, very correctly. We rightly left it to MCC to make their choice... they made their choice on merit, so they said, time and again... but the moment the decision was known, there was an outcry, an outcry because a certain gentleman of colour was omitted on merit by the MCC selection committee... and from then on it was political bodyline bowling all the way until today."
- Mexico changed their flag at Independence Day.
- Presidential candidate Richard Nixon broke precedent by joining the many celebrities who had cameo appearances on the popular Rowan & Martin's Laugh-In show to utter the show's catchphrase, "Sock it to me", as the program opened its second season. Nixon's appearance was a pre-recorded, three-second clip where Nixon awkwardly feigned surprise and asked, "Sock it to me???" A contemporary report, made after Newsweek magazine broke the surprise, noted that "Only a few years ago it would have been inconceivable that a candidate for President of the United States would appear on a television variety show", and a historian would note more than 40 years later that the clip "made explicit the historic juncture between presidential politics and popular entertainment" by "using entertainment television to bypass the press and actively construct a public image of a likable, popular personality to assert his political legitimacy."
- Born: Marc Anthony (stage name for Marco Antonio Muñiz), Hispanic-American singer and Grammy Award winner; in New York City

== September 17, 1968 (Tuesday) ==
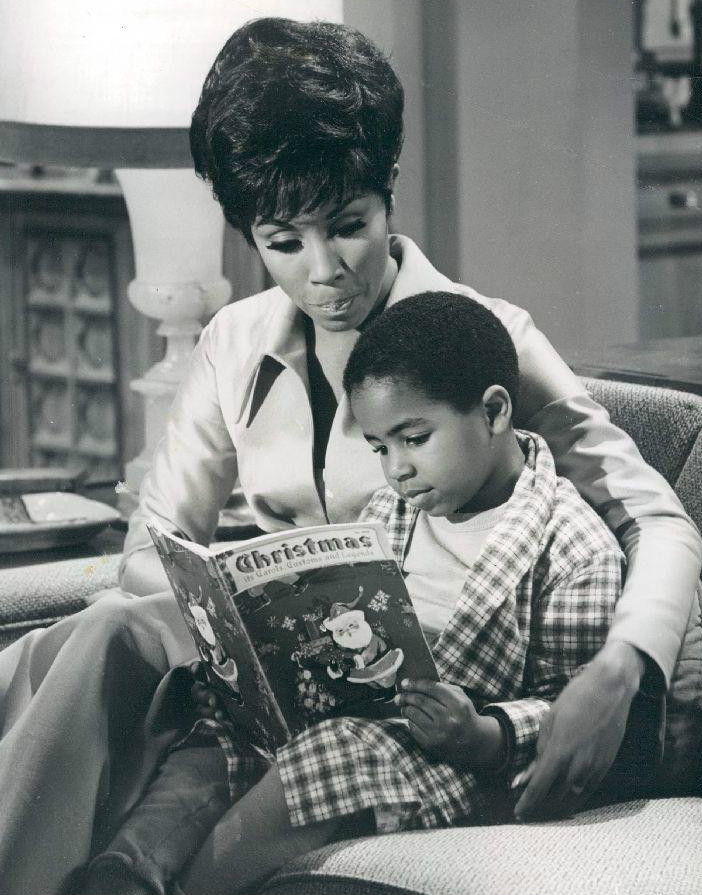
Diahann Carroll and Marc Copage in Julia

- Julia, described by one critic as "the first non-Negro-stereotype TV situation comedy to star a Negro actress", premiered at 8:30 Eastern time on the NBC television network and began a three-season run. Actress and singer Diahann Carroll portrayed Julia Baker, a recently widowed black nurse, with Lloyd Nolan in a supporting role as Baker's white boss and Marc Copage as her 6-year-old son, Corey. Another child actor, Michael Link, appeared as Corey's white friend, Earl J. Waggedorn. Hal Kanter was the creator-producer of a show that was generally praised by television critics. One critic noted that the situation comedy "is very low pressure, admirably without a laugh track, and weaves in warmth, bite and a social needle... of course it must deal at times with black-white relationships, but it is not, and does not pretend to be, a social tract", adding, "It has been suggested by some that 'Julia' is not going to give a true representation of Negro life, and that may very well be so. On the other hand it might be argued that white situation comedies hardly give a true representation of white life in the United States. This may not be anything to cheer about overall, but it seems unfair to expect 'Julia' to solve all the world's problems." Another critic noted that the premiere episode's "frequent reference to skin color... is rather unusual", acknowledging that "Before this, there was I Spy, but that series blandly ignored the fact that Bill Cosby was a Negro", and noting that the sitcom "shapes up as a benign, light half hour, brightened by Miss Carroll's good looks and charm and warmed by the cute little boy who plays her son."
- The U.S. Department of State sent a letter to the Foreign Ministry of the People's Republic of China (by way of the Chinese embassy in Poland), proposing that the two nations, then enemies, begin discussing the possibility of establishing diplomatic relations and exchanging ambassadors. Two days later, "to the amazement of the U.S. side", China responded favorably, claiming that it wanted to "maintain friendly relations with all states, regardless of social system, on the basis of 1954's Five Principles of Peaceful Coexistence".
- With the endorsement of the United Nations, the Western half of the island of New Guinea was formally incorporated into Indonesia as that nation's 26th province, Irian Jaya. In 2000, the name of Irian Jaya would be changed to Papua (not to be confused with the independent Republic of Papua New Guinea) on the other half of the island, and limited autonomy would be granted to the westernmost part of the province as West Papua.
- The Detroit Tigers won the American League pennant to reach baseball's World Series after the second-place Baltimore Orioles lost to the Boston Red Sox, 2–0. The Orioles, 10 games behind the first place Tigers with only nine games left in the season, were mathematically eliminated 30 minutes before the Tigers beat the New York Yankees, 2–1.
- Supporting development work in the Apollo Applications Program (AAP) was eliminated, except that of an urgent or critical nature. This reduction in program supporting development work was the result of budget restrictions when available appropriated funds were reduced from $32.0 million to $18.2 million for Apollo and AAP.
- Born: Anastacia (Anastacia Lyn Newkirk), American singer-songwriter and philanthropist; in Chicago
- Died:
  - King Cyprian Bhekuzulu kaSolomon, 44, recognized as the paramount chief and monarch of South Africa's three million Zulu people since 1948. King Cyprian's eldest son, Goodwill Zwelithini kaBhekuzulu, succeeded him as monarch.
  - Armand Blanchonnet, 64, French bicyclist and gold medalist in the 1924 Summer Olympics

== September 18, 1968 (Wednesday) ==
- The Soviet space probe Zond 5 made its closest approach to the Moon, coming within 1,950 kilometres (1,210 mi) of the lunar surface in a circumnavigation (using lunar gravity) rather than multiple orbits, then began its return to Earth, where the Jodrell Bank observatory in England noted the achievement. "Only at this point", an author would note later, "did the Soviets actually admit to having launched the mission!"
- The American Intelsat III F-1, also known as "Atlantic 3" and as the largest communications satellite designed up to that time, was destroyed along with the new Delta M rocket. Although Delta rockets had been successfully launched 25 times in a row, the more powerful Delta M version failed on its maiden flight, exploding "in a ball of reddish-orange flame" after its gyroscopic system failed only 20 seconds after liftoff from Cape Kennedy. Atlantic 3 had been intended to relay live telecasts of the upcoming Summer Olympic Games from Mexico City to Western Europe, and its loss would require European networks to hastily change their plans.
- Candlestick Park in San Francisco had its second no-hitter baseball game in as many days. St. Louis Cardinals' Ray Washburn pitched a no-hitter to beat the San Francisco Giants, 2–0, a day after the Giants' Gaylord Perry had a no-hit 1–0 win over the Cardinals. The only other venue for two no-hitters in two days had been Sportsman's Park in St. Louis on May 6 and 7, 1917, in two wins by the St. Louis Browns over the Chicago White Sox.
- San Francisco State University became the first American college to institute a "black studies" program of classes in response to student protests. Starting with UCLA the next semester, other colleges and universities would follow suit.
- Born: Toni Kukoč, Croatian professional basketball forward who starred in EuroLeague competition and later in the NBA; in Split, Croatia, Yugoslavia
- Died: Franchot Tone, 63, American film actor, died of lung cancer

== September 19, 1968 (Thursday) ==
- Mickey Mantle of the New York Yankees hit the 535th home run of his major league baseball career, surpassing Jimmie Foxx and moving to third place on the career home list, behind Babe Ruth (714 homers) and Willie Mays (who had 585 at the time) in a 6–2 loss to the Detroit Tigers. The Tigers' Denny McLain, who got his 31st win, threw an easy pitch to Mantle in the 8th inning with a 6–1 lead, no Yankees on base, and Mantle already having two strikes. Mantle would retire with 536 home runs, and would be surpassed by Hank Aaron in 1969; by 2017, he would be 18th on the all-time list.
- At the request of the Soviet Union, the Communist Party of Czechoslovakia began a purge of a list of Czechoslovak government officials, beginning with Foreign Minister Jiří Hájek, who had dared to take the issue of the invasion of Czechoslovakia before the United Nations Security Council.
- Born: Chung Yong-jin, South Korean billionaire businessman, Vice Chairman of Shinsegae; in Seoul
- Died:
  - Clyde "Red" Foley, 58, American gospel and country music artist and inductee to the Country Music Hall of Fame, died of pulmonary edema the morning after a concert in Fort Wayne, Indiana.
  - Chester Carlson, 62, American physicist known for inventing xerography, died of a heart attack.

== September 20, 1968 (Friday) ==
- William Henry Furman, an African American criminal defendant who would become the appellant in the landmark U.S. Supreme Court case of Furman v. Georgia, was tried, convicted and sentenced to death for murder in a one-day trial in Savannah. Furman's sentence of death in the electric chair would be appealed upward and lead to the Supreme Court's decision, on June 28, 1972, effectively voiding the death sentences of all prisoners who were awaiting execution in the United States.
- At the Farnborough Airshow in the UK, a French Air Force Breguet Atlantic airplane crashed into the offices of the Royal Aircraft Establishment (RAE) while performing a display. One of the RAE's civilian maintenance staff was killed, as were all five members of the crew. The accident was the first that the Farnborough show, he United Kingdom's largest air exposition and second largest in the world, for the first time since 1952 when
- Eastern Airlines Flight 950 was hijacked during its flight from San Juan, Puerto Rico to Miami, and diverted to Havana, marking the eighth hijacking of an airplane to Cuba in 1968.
- Born:
  - Mitch Mullany, American comedian and star of the TV series Nick Freno: Licensed Teacher; in Oakland (died of diabetic stroke, 2008)
  - Van Jones (Anthony Kapel Jones), American political activist, author and news commentator; in Jackson, Tennessee
  - Darrell Russell, American drag racer and 2001 NHRA Rookie of the Year; in Houston (killed in accident, 2004)
  - Leah Pinsent, Canadian television and film actress; in Toronto
- Died: Max Fremerey, 79, German major general who guided the tank assault on Stalingrad during World War II

== September 21, 1968 (Saturday) ==
- The police television series Adam-12, starring Martin Milner and Kent McCord as Los Angeles Police Department officers Pete Malloy and Jim Reed, began the first of seven seasons on the NBC network. Created by Jack Webb and R. A. Cinader, Adam-12 differed from previous police dramas because it followed the officers on routine calls rather than having a case to solve, as in Webb's Dragnet series. Critics were generally negative; one critic said that Adam-12 was one of four weekend shows and that "None, unhappily, seems destined to set the TV world on fire"; another critic wrote that the show "was so corny, it was embarrassing... How Jack Webb could allow his name to be connected with this little inanity is beyond comprehension", and added that "Except for one well-shot car crash", Adam-12 "had as much interest as a police docket on a slow night." Nevertheless, the show would prove to be a surprise success, running for seven seasons, and would pave the way for future shows where cameras followed real police crews on patrol, such as the pre-recorded 1990s Fox Network show Cops, and the live broadcasts of police patrols on Live PD in 2017.
- The Soviet Union uncrewed lunar spaceship Zond 5 was recovered intact, in the southern Indian Ocean, roughly 105 kilometres (65 mi) from the nearest Soviet Navy ship and several hundred miles southeast of Mauritius. The Zond probe had missed its planned landing site after it re-entered Earth's gravity at a steep angle, and was the first to be recovered on water rather than on land. The first return of an object to Earth after a circumnavigation of the Moon led to speculation that the Soviets were planning a crewed mission to land cosmonauts on the Moon before the United States could do so. However, U.S. presidential science adviser Donald Hornig would inform President Johnson that the reports about Zond 5 "grossly exaggerated the importance and significance of this event" and that "we are at least one year ahead of the Soviets" in reaching the Moon. Sources differ as to whether the capsule's collection of biological specimens (bacteria, seeds, plants, flies, worms and turtles) did or did not survive atmospheric re-entry.
- Born: Ricki Lake, American television talk show host and film actress; in Hastings-on-Hudson, New York
- Died: Charles R. Jackson, 65, American novelist, died of an overdose of barbiturates. Jackson was best known for his 1944 bestseller about an alcoholic writer, The Lost Weekend, which would be adapted to an Academy Award-winning film of the same name, and had a 1967 bestseller with A Second-Hand Life. At the time of his death, Jackson had completed 300 pages of a never-finished sequel to The Lost Weekend.

== September 22, 1968 (Sunday) ==
- The Abu Simbel temples in Egypt were reopened to the public, four years after the process of relocating them had started. Completed in 1244 BC during the reign of the Pharaoh Ramesses II as a commemoration of his victory in the Battle of Kadesh in 1274 BC, the 2,242-year-old structures had been threatened by the damming of the Nile River by the Aswan Dam. The two temples were cut apart into 1,042 blocks, then reassembled on a 65 metres (213 ft) high hill, located 200 metres (660 ft) away from their former site, which was now beneath the waters of Lake Nasser.
- As air piracy continued, two separate Colombian airline flights were skyjacked just hours apart and forced to fly to Cuba within three hours of each other, both of them Avianca flights departing from Barranquilla. The first, a Boeing 727 with 72 passengers and a crew of six, was on a 15-minute flight to Cartagena when it diverted by a grenade-wielding passenger to Camagüey, Cuba's third largest city. The other flight, a DC-4 with 57 passengers and 4 crew, was en route to Medellín before being flown to Santiago de Cuba, the island nation's second largest city.
- Land of the Giants, the latest science fiction TV series produced by Irwin Allen, premiered on the ABC network for the first of two seasons. The premise was that on June 12, 1983, the spaceship Spindrift was making a routine suborbital flight from Los Angeles to London when it somehow ended up on another planet similar to 1960s Earth, but where the plants, animals, people and buildings were all 12 times taller.
- A total eclipse of the Sun took place, with the greatest visibility of totality in the Kazakh SSR of the Soviet Union, and Xinjiang province in China.
- Born:
  - Sir Robert Buckland, Welsh politician serving as Secretary of State for Wales since 2022, served as Justice Secretary and Lord Chancellor from 2019 to 2021; in Llanelli
  - Mihai Răzvan Ungureanu, Prime Minister of Romania for 3 months in 2012 and former Foreign Minister; in Iași

== September 23, 1968 (Monday) ==
- Lucille Ball premiered her third television situation comedy in a row, as Here's Lucy debuted with Ball and co-star Gale Gordon as different characters than they had played on The Lucy Show, which was as a prime-time rerun a week earlier. Formerly "Lucy Carmichael", Ball now played "Lucy Carter"; she was still a widowed mother with a son and a daughter, working as a secretary for Gordon's character. This time, however, her children (Kim and Craig) were portrayed by Ball's real-life children, Lucie Arnaz and Desi Arnaz Jr. Gordon, formerly "Mr. Mooney", was now "Harry Carter", Lucy's brother-in-law. "It seems that we've seen this all before", a critic noted, "but when Lucille Ball plays it, it is valid and funny." Another wrote that "Unfortunately, there was nothing unique about the opening show", and described the first episode as "silly and tedious and even an all out Lucy could not improve it."
- Mayberry R.F.D. premiered as a continuation of The Andy Griffith Show, with Sheriff Andy Taylor (Andy Griffith) appearing in the opening episode and marrying Helen Crump (Aneta Corsaut), then moving away with his son Opie (Ron Howard). Most of the previous show's cast remained for the new series, including Frances Bavier (Aunt Bee), George Lindsey and Jack Dodson. Ken Berry was the new lead actor as a new character, Sam Jones, and Buddy Foster portrayed his son Mike. With Don Knotts reprising his role as Barney Fife for the first episode, Mayberry R.F.D. was the most-watched show of the week. A critic noted that "Berry has his work cut out for him to keep life as interesting and funny in Mayberry as Sheriff Andy has for the past eight seasons."
- Georgios Papadopoulos, the Prime Minister and leader of the military government of Greece, ordered the release of seven political opponents who had been held in exile on various "remote Greek island villages" for 16 months, including former Prime Ministers Panagiotis Kanellopoulos and Georgios Papandreou. The others set free were former government ministers Georgios Mavros, Georgios Rallis, Stelios Allamanis, Demetrios Papaspyrou and Iakovos Diamantopoulos.
- The third and final phase of the Tet Offensive — Phase III — came to an end with the withdrawal of the North Vietnamese Army's 5th, 7th and 9th infantry from Tây Ninh Province and Bình Long Province, more than six weeks after the August 17 attack on 27 South Vietnamese cities and towns, as well as 47 airfields and 100 outposts.
- Three days of design review of the Apollo Telescope Mount began at the Manned Space Flight Center.
- Born:
  - Michelle Thomas, American actress; in Boston (died of cancer, 1998)
  - Yvette Fielding, English actress and TV host; in Manchester
- Died: Padre Pio (Francesco Forgione), 81, Roman Catholic monk and hospital founder who received the stigmata in 1918 after a vision of Jesus Christ; his death came 50 years and three days after the miracle, and the stigmata disappeared soon after his death. He would be canonized in 2002 as Saint Pius of Pietrelcina.

== September 24, 1968 (Tuesday) ==
- The CBS television news show 60 Minutes, produced by Don Hewitt made its debut at 10:00 Eastern time, with Mike Wallace and Harry Reasoner as the hosts. One critic acknowledged Hewitt's attempt to make the program "look as much as possible as a magazine" and concluded that it "was bright and breezy and went a long way in bridging the great gap between the ha-ha of TV entertainment and the dolorous solemnity of public affairs programs". The first story on the first show was a report about the Republican and Democratic national conventions from August, comparing and contrasting the reactions of both Richard Nixon and Hubert Humphrey to their respective nominations for the presidency. The program would begin its 50th consecutive season in 2017.
- The Mod Squad began a five-season run on ABC with a 90-minute made-for-television movie to introduce the characters. One critic noted that "ABC 'stretched' the initial episode... and may have cost the series its life in doing it", adding that "the tedium endured by minutes of posing by the cast are bound to make dial turners out of many viewers."
- Jorge Pacheco Areco, the President of Uruguay, formally instituted censorship of the press in the South American nation.
- Died: Thakin Than Tun, 57, Burmese politician who had been the Chairman of the Communist Party of Burma since 1950, was assassinated by a government agent.

== September 25, 1968 (Wednesday) ==
- Democratic Party presidential nominee Hubert H. Humphrey proposed a series of three candidate debates with Republican Richard M. Nixon and American Independent candidate George C. Wallace, telling students at Pepperdine College in Los Angeles that if the candidates could "be heard together on the same platform in the same towns at the same time.... we wouldn't be voting on who has the most razzledazzle, the most money or the most slogans." Nixon, who had a 43% to 28% lead over Humphrey in opinion polls and who had performed poorly in presidential debates in 1960, declined the proposal two days later.
- In a move to block a vote on the approval of Abe Fortas as Chief Justice of the United States in a U.S. Senate that had a 63 to 37 advantage for the Democrats, Republican U.S. Senator Robert P. Griffin began a filibuster, leading off with a 50-page long speech against the nomination. Although the Democrats had enough votes to confirm Fortas, they fell short of the 67 votes needed for a two-thirds vote for cloture to end a filibuster. Ultimately, Fortas would withdraw his name as the filibuster continued, and Warren Burger would be nominated by Nixon in 1969.
- Communist political parties, outlawed in West Germany since 1956 (while being the ruling party in East Germany since 1949), became legal again as the Deutsche Kommunistische Partei (KPD or German Communist Party) was founded. East Germany's Communist organization, the Socialist Unity Party of Germany (Sozialistische Einheitspartei Deutschlands) funded West Germany's KPD until the reunification of Germany in 1990.
- Here Come the Brides, a television western set in 1864 and inspired by the actual Mercer Girls project started by Asa Mercer to bring women from the eastern United States to the Pacific Northwest, began a two-season run on ABC. Actor Robert Brown starred as Jason Bolt, the analog to Asa Mercer.
- Born:
  - Will Smith, American TV and film actor, rap artist and singer originally nicknamed "The Fresh Prince", before beginning a successful television and movie career; as Willard Carroll Smith II in Philadelphia
  - Prince Friso of Orange-Nassau, younger brother of King Willem-Alexander of the Netherlands and second child of Queen Beatrix; in Utrecht (died of injuries, 2013)
  - John A. List, American economist; in Madison, Wisconsin

== September 26, 1968 (Thursday) ==
- The long running CBS police drama Hawaii Five-O premiered on CBS at 8:00 p.m. and began a 12-season run and 284-episode run that would last until April 5, 1980. The hour-long series had been preceded by a pilot which had been shown by CBS on September 20 as a made-for-television movie; the pilot would be edited into two episodes shown at the end of the first season. Jack Lord appeared as Steve McGarrett, Commander of the Five-0 Task Force. Critical reaction to the series was favorable, as the AP writer described it as "a welcome addition to the network's schedule— a fast-paced, sharply produced police series with good acting an added plus in the authentic island background", in that it was filmed entirely on location in Hawaii. A historian would note later that "What made Hawaii Five-O unique right from the beginning was that it was filmed entirely on location... great care was taken to actually make the exotic scenery a character in and of itself." Competing against ABC's Bewitched and NBC's Ironside, Five-O had poor ratings at first, but got enough additional viewers after a shift to 10:00 Wednesday night and would be renewed for a second season. Its record as the longest-running crime show in television history would be broken by Law & Order in 2003.
- Censorship of plays was abolished in the United Kingdom as the Theatres Act 1968, approved on July 26, went into effect and ended the existence of the position of Examiner of Plays in the Lord Chamberlain's Office after 230 years. With the government approval no longer required, the rock musical Hair (which included a scene with a fully nude cast) made its British premiere on London's West End at the Shaftesbury Theatre.
- What would become known as the "Brezhnev Doctrine"— that every Communist nation outside the USSR had the duty to intervene in the affairs of other socialist nations in order to protect "the entire Communist movement"— was announced in an article in the Communist Party newspaper Pravda, written by party official Sergei Kovalev and titled "Sovereignty and the International Obligations of Socialist Countries".
- The Deutsche Kommunistische Partei (DKP or German Communist Party) was founded in Frankfurt-am-Main in West Germany to replace the former Communist Party of Germany that had been banned in 1956.
- Brazil's military government enacted Decree-Law No. 63,283 to become "the first country in the world to license public relations", although public relations businesses had not yet come into existence.
- Born:
  - Jim Caviezel, American actor best for the title role in the film The Passion of the Christ and as the star of the TV series Person of Interest; in Mount Vernon, Washington
  - Ben Shenkman, American stage and cable television actor; in New York City
- Died: Daniel Johnson Sr., 53, Canadian politician and Premier of Quebec since 1966, died of a heart attack in Manicouagan, Quebec, on the day that he was scheduled to dedicate the world's largest multi-arch dam, the Manicouagan-5 (nicknamed "Manic 5"). Johnson apparently died an hour before he was discovered at his cottage at 7:00 in the morning; the ceremony went on as scheduled, but a plaque that proclaimed that he had poured the last bucket of concrete into Manic 5 remained veiled. The structure would be renamed the Daniel-Johnson Dam soon afterward.

== September 27, 1968 (Friday) ==
- In London, King Hussein of Jordan and his adviser, Zaid Al-Rifai met secretly with three Israeli officials for peace negotiations a year after the Six-Day War of 1967. Labor Minister Yigal Allon, Foreign Minister Abba Eban, and Yaakov Herzog (chief adviser to Israel's Prime Minister Levi Eshkol had agreed to King Hussein's suggestion that they all meet in the United Kingdom to discuss Allon's peace proposal, the Allon Plan, that would have returned half of the captured West Bank to Jordanian control. The Allon Plan, however, was contingent upon the recognition of Israel's right to exist by its Arab neighbors, and the parties would not agree.
- After 36 years as the absolute ruler of and Prime Minister of Portugal, Antonio de Oliveira Salazar was removed from office when doctors concluded that he would not be able to recover from a stroke that he had suffered earlier in the month. Portugal's President, Américo Tomás, replaced Salazar with a former Portuguese government official, Marcelo Caetano. Salazar would eventually wake up from his coma, "but was not told of his removal because his doctors feared the shock would kill him" and, as such, he spent the remaining 20 months of his life "believing that he still controlled the country."
- The Brussels Convention, specifically the Convention on Jurisdiction and the Enforcement of Judgments in Civil and Commercial Matters, was opened for signature by the six member states of the European Economic Community (Belgium, France, Italy, Luxembourg, the Netherlands and West Germany) as the parties agreed to give full faith and credit to court judgments of the member nations. As new nations joined the EEC and then the European Union, they would accept the Brussels Convention as well and it is now applicable in 28 European nations.
- Born: Mari Kiviniemi, Prime Minister of Finland from 2010 to 2011; in Seinäjoki

== September 28, 1968 (Saturday) ==
- The Atlanta Chiefs beat the San Diego Toros, 3 to 0, to win the first championship of the North American Soccer League, the highest level professional soccer football league in the United States. The championship was decided based on the combined score of two games, one in each team's home stadium, and the September 21 meeting at San Diego had finished in a 0 to 0 tie. The second game took place at Atlanta Stadium, the home of the NFL Falcons, the NL Braves and the Chiefs, and had an attendance of 14,994 people.
- All 57 people on board a Pan African Airlines airliner were killed in Nigeria, along with one person on the ground, when the propeller driven Douglas C-54B clipped the tops of two 50 foot (15 m) high trees while making its approach to Port Harcourt on a nighttime flight from Lagos. In addition to the passengers, the plane was also carrying a cargo of munitions that exploded upon impact and caused a massive fire that killed the plane's occupants and one person in a village near the airport.
- King Faisal of Saudi Arabia issued a royal decree ordering the distribution of uncultivated farmland, in plots of 10 hectares (25 acres) apiece, to any Saudi Arabian citizen who agreed to use it to grow crops; the plan, however, "failed to significantly expand the area under cultivation" in the desert kingdom.
- Born:
  - Sean Levert, American R&B singer and co-founder of the R&B trio LeVert; in Cleveland (d. 2008)
  - Mika Häkkinen, Finnish racing driver and Formula One World Champion in 1998 and 1999; in Vantaa
  - Naomi Watts, British-Australian actress; in Shoreham, England.
- Died: Norman Brookes, 90, Australian tennis champion who won the men's singles at Wimbledon in 1907 and 1914, and the Australian Open in 1911.

== September 29, 1968 (Sunday) ==
- The cause of action that would lead to the landmark U.S. Supreme Court decision in United States v. United States District Court— referred to more often as "the Keith case" because it was a challenge to an order by U.S. District Court Judge Damon Keith— arose when a dynamite bomb was exploded outside of an office in Ann Arbor, Michigan, used for recruitment by the CIA. Nobody was injured, but, after an investigation that included wiretapping, the blast was traced to three American men who would be indicted for conspiracy to destroy government property. Judge Keith's order, that the U.S. government must disclose its evidence even to a subversive group, would be challenged, and lead to a unanimous 1972 ruling by the U.S. Supreme Court that would require a warrant for electronic surveillance by the United States against American citizens.
- Pierre Mulele, a former Congolese government minister who had led the Simba rebellion against the government of the Democratic Republic of the Congo in 1964, voluntarily returned to his homeland after being offered amnesty by Congo's President Joseph Mobutu. Three days after coming home (and being honored at a welcoming reception), Mulele was arrested and charged with being a "war criminal", at which point President Mobutu said that the amnesty did not apply to war crimes. Convicted of the charges, Mulele was executed by a firing squad on October 7.
- By a reported 97 percent margin, voters in a referendum in Greece overwhelmingly approved a constitution giving stronger powers to the military junta led by Colonel George Papadopoulos, and approved Article 138, which formally suspended basic individual rights such as freedom of the press, the right of assembly, and protection from previously illegal searches, or arbitrary arrest and imprisonment. Greece remained a monarchy, but King Constantine II was stripped of most of his powers.
- Born: Samir Soni, Indian television actor; in New Delhi

== September 30, 1968 (Monday) ==
- Trailing Republican candidate Richard M. Nixon in presidential preference polls, Democratic Party candidate and U.S. Vice President Hubert H. Humphrey made the decision to come out against U.S. President Johnson's policy on the Vietnam War. From Salt Lake City in Utah, Humphrey delivered a speech pledging that if elected, he would halt U.S. bombing of North Vietnam unconditionally; his prepared remarks said "I would be willing to stop the bombing" and, as he spoke, he changed it to "I would stop the bombing." Humphrey also stated that any bombing halt would not be without conditions, he added that prior to a cessation, he "would place key importance on evidence—direct or indirect, by word or deed—of Communist willingness to restore the demilitarized zone between South and North Vietnam." He further stated that he "would support the resumption of bombing if the North Vietnamese were to show bad faith, the immediate impact was that donations to the Humphrey campaign would increase." President Johnson explained the fallacy of unilaterally halting the bombing of military targets in North Vietnam without any assurances from Hanoi in a phone call to Richard Nixon that same day.
- The Boeing 747, the largest passenger aircraft ever built up to that time, was rolled out to the public and the media at an event at Boeing's test facility, Paine Field, at Everett, Washington. The first of the wide-bodied airliners referred to as a "jumbo jet", the 747-100 was 80 feet (24 m) longer, 20 feet (6.1 m) taller, and had a wingspan 50 feet (15 m) wider than the next largest airliner, the Boeing 707, and could carry 360 or more passengers, twice as many as the 707. The rolled-out model had the insignia of 28 different airlines that had placed orders for the new plane.
