= 1540 (disambiguation) =

1540 may refer to:

- 1540, a number in the 1000s range
- AD 1540 (MDXL), a year in the Common Era
- 1540 BC, a year Before the Common Era
- 1540 AM, an AM radio frequency
- Commodore 1540, a model of floppy disk drive
- United Nations Security Council Resolution 1540, on the non-proliferation of WMDs
