= 1280s BC =

Decade

The 1280s BC was a decade that lasted from 1289 BC to 1280 BC.

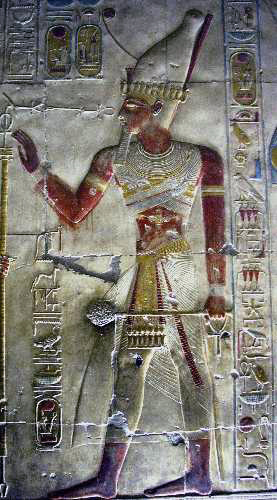
Seti I from his temple in Abydos (Egypt)

== Events and trends ==
- 1290 BC—Seti I becomes pharaoh of Egypt. During his reign he leads his armies into Asia, asserting Egyptian imperial authority. Seti recaptures the traitorous vassals of Kadesh and Amurru, and even defeats a Hittite force. Later, he is unable to maintain control over the territories in the Levant and eventually concludes peace with the Hittite king Muwatalli II.
- c. 1285 BC—Judgement of Hunefer before Osiris, illustration from a Book of the Dead is painted (19th Dynasty). It is now in the British Museum at London.
- 1282 BC—Pandion II, legendary King of Athens, dies after a nominal reign of 25 years. He reportedly only reigned in Megara, while Athens and the rest of Attica were under the control of an alliance of Nobles led by his uncle Metion (son of Erechtheus of Athens) and his sons (including in some accounts Daedalus). His four sons lead a successful military campaign to regain the throne. Aegeus becomes King of Athens, Nisos reigns in Megara, Lykos in Euboea and Pallas in southern Attica.
- c. 1280 BC—The Torah is believed to have been fully composed around this time. (Assuming the Exodus from Egypt took place c. 1450 BCE)
- The walls of Troy VII/Wilusa are constructed.

== Significant people ==
- Seti I, pharaoh of Egypt (1290 BC–1279 BC) (19th Dynasty)
- Alaksandu of Wilusa, some believe would be the same Paris of Troy
