= 1340s BC =

The 1340s BC is a decade that lasted from 1349 BC to 1340 BC.

== Events and trends ==
- c. 1348 BC—Pharaoh Amenhotep IV changes his name to Akhenaten.
- 1348 BC–1336 BC: Akhenaten and his family, relief from Akhetaten (modern el-Amarna) was made. 18th dynasty. It is now in Staatliche Museen zu Berlin, Stiftung Preußischer Kulturbesitz, Ägyptisches Museum.
- c. 1348 BC–1336 BC: Nefertiti, bust from Akhetaten (modern Amarna) was made. 18th dynasty. It is now in Staatliche Museen zu Berlin, Stiftung Preußischer Kulturbesitz, Ägyptisches Museum.
- c. 1348 BC–1336 BC: Tish-shaped vase, from Akhetaten (modern Tell el-Amarna) was made. 18th dynasty. It is now in the British Museum, London.
- c. 1348 BC–1327 BC: State ship, detail of a tempera facsimile by Charles K. Wilkinson of a cow painting in the tomb of the governor of Nubia Amenhotep Huy in Qurnet Murai was made. 18th dynasty. It is now in the Metropolitan Museum of Art, New York.
- 1347 BC—Legendary King Erechtheus II is reportedly killed by lightning after a reign of 50 years and is followed by his younger brother Cecrops II.
- 1346 BC—Amenhotep IV of Egypt begins his Cult of Aten and begins construction of Amarna intended to be his new capital.
- 1345 BC–Amenhotep IV of Egypt renames himself to Akhenaten.
- c. 1344 BC–King Šuppiluliuma I of the Hittites invades the Anatolian heartland and launches two campaigns against the Mitanni. This culminates in the sack of the Mitanni capital Washukanni.
- 1342 BC—Pharaoh King Tut (Tutankhamun/Tutankhamen) is born.
- c. 1340 BC—Citadel walls are built in Mycenae.

== Births ==
- c. 1341 BC - Tutankhamun, Pharaoh of Egypt
- c. 1348 BC - Ankhesenamun
