= 1410s BC =

The 1410s BC is a decade that lasted from 1419 BC to 1410 BC.

== Events and trends ==
- 1420 BC — Hebrew Exodus from Egypt (one proposed date).
- 1420 BC — Incumbent Shahram from Persia declared his kingdom.

== Significant people ==
- Amenhotep II, Pharaoh of Egypt, (1427 BC–1401 BC)
