= 1095 (disambiguation) =

1095 may refer to:

- a number in the 1000s number range.

== Time ==
- 1095 CE, a year in the 11th-century A.D.
- 1095 BC, a year in the 2nd-millennium BCE

== Other uses ==
- 1095 Tulipa, the asteroid 1095
- SAE 1095, a grade of carbon steel suitable for springs and blands
- Design 1095 ship, #1095 design of New York Shipbuilding Corporation for USNavy requirements in sealift during WWI
- Form 1095, a 1095, the U.S. IRS tax form
