= 990s BC =

Decade

The 990s BC is a decade that lasted from 999 BC to 990 BC.

== Events and trends ==
- 998 BC—King David establishes Jerusalem as the capital of the Kingdom of Israel.
- 994 BC—Archippus, Archon of Athens dies after a reign of 19 years and is succeeded by his son Thersippus.
- 993 BC—Amenemope succeeds Psusennes I as king of Egypt.

== Significant people ==
- Tiglath-Pileser II, king of Assyria, is born (approximate date).
- Solomon, king of Israel, is born (approximate date).
