= 970s BC =

Decade

The 970s BC is a decade that lasted from 979 BC to 970 BC.

== Events and trends ==
- Possible date of the death of King David. Coronation of King Solomon (according to Bible).

== Significant people ==
- King Zhao of Zhou (reign 977/75-957) fourth king of the Chinese Zhou dynasty ascended the throne.
- Shoshenq I, pharaoh of Egypt. is born (approximate date); "Shishak" of 1 Kings 14:25.
