= Chronology =

Science of arranging events in order of occurrence

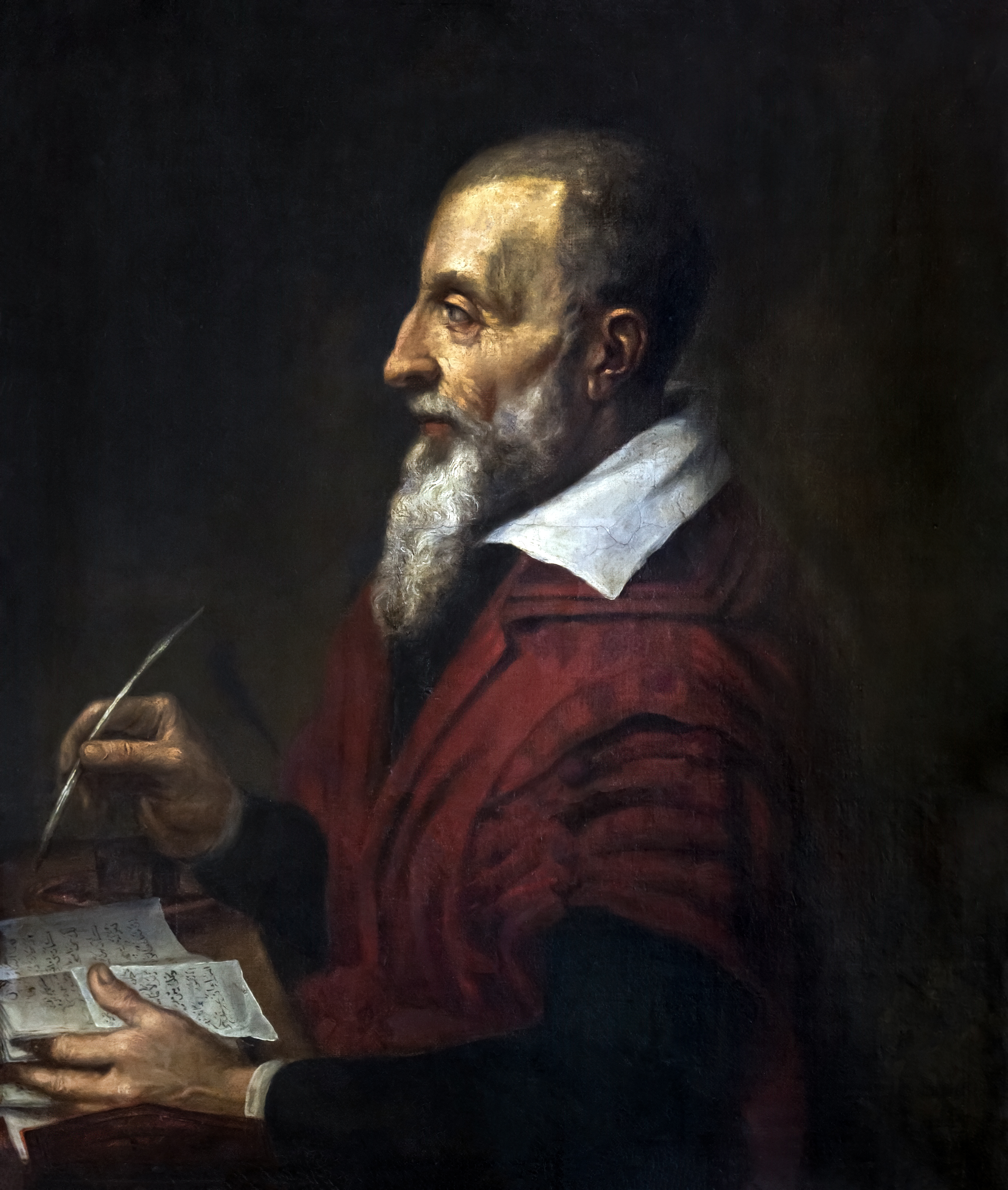
Joseph Scaliger's De emendatione temporum (1583) began the modern science of chronology

Chronology (from Latin chronologia, from Ancient Greek χρόνος, chrónos, 'time'; and -λογία, -logia) is the science of arranging events in their order of occurrence in time, such as in a timeline or other sequence of events. It is also "the determination of the actual temporal sequence of past events".

Chronology is part of periodization. It is also part of the discipline of history, including Earth history, the earth sciences, and study of the geologic time scale.

== Related fields ==
Chronology is the science of locating historical events in time. It relies mostly upon chronometry, which is also known as timekeeping, and historiography, which examines the writing of history and the use of historical methods. Radiocarbon dating estimates the age of formerly living things by measuring the proportion of carbon-14 isotope in their carbon content. Dendrochronology estimates the age of trees by correlation of the various growth rings in their wood to known year-by-year reference sequences in the region to reflect year-to-year climatic variation. Dendrochronology is used in turn as a calibration reference for radiocarbon dating curves.

== Calendar and era ==
The familiar terms calendar and era (within the meaning of a coherent system of numbered calendar years) concern two complementary fundamental concepts of chronology. For example, during eight centuries the calendar belonging to the Christian era, which era was taken in use in the 8th century by Bede, was the Julian calendar, but after the year 1582 it was the Gregorian calendar. Dionysius Exiguus (about the year 500) was the founder of that era, which is nowadays the most widespread dating system on earth. An epoch is the date (year usually) when an era begins.

=== Ab Urbe condita era ===
Ab Urbe condita is Latin for "from the founding of the City (Rome)", traditionally set in 753 BC. It was used to identify the Roman year by a few Roman historians. Modern historians use it much more frequently than the Romans themselves did; the dominant method of identifying Roman years was to name the two consuls who held office that year. Before the advent of the modern critical edition of historical Roman works, AUC was indiscriminately added to them by earlier editors, making it appear more widely used than it actually was.

It was used systematically for the first time only about the year 400, by the Iberian historian Orosius. Pope Boniface IV, in about the year 600, seems to have been the first who made a connection between this era and Anno Domini. (AD 1 = AUC 754.)

=== Astronomical era ===
Dionysius Exiguus' Anno Domini era (which contains only calendar years AD) was extended by Bede to the complete Christian era (which contains, in addition all calendar years BC, but no year zero). Ten centuries after Bede, the French astronomers Philippe de la Hire (in the year 1702) and Jacques Cassini (in the year 1740), purely to simplify certain calculations, put the Julian Dating System (proposed in the year 1583 by Joseph Scaliger) and with it an astronomical era into use, which contains a leap year zero, which precedes the year 1 (AD).

== Prehistory ==
While of critical importance to the historian, methods of determining chronology are used in most disciplines of science, especially astronomy, geology, paleontology and archaeology.

In the absence of written history, with its chronicles and king lists, late 19th century archaeologists found that they could develop relative chronologies based on pottery techniques and styles. In the field of Egyptology, William Flinders Petrie pioneered sequence dating to penetrate pre-dynastic Neolithic times, using groups of contemporary artefacts deposited together at a single time in graves and working backwards methodically from the earliest historical phases of Egypt. This method of dating is known as seriation.

Known wares discovered at strata in sometimes quite distant sites, the product of trade, helped extend the network of chronologies. Some cultures have retained the name applied to them in reference to characteristic forms, for lack of an idea of what they called themselves: "The Beaker People" in northern Europe during the 3rd millennium BCE, for example. The study of the means of placing pottery and other cultural artifacts into some kind of order proceeds in two phases, classification and typology: Classification creates categories for the purposes of description, and typology seeks to identify and analyse changes that allow artifacts to be placed into sequences.

Laboratory techniques developed particularly after mid-20th century helped constantly revise and refine the chronologies developed for specific cultural areas. Unrelated dating methods help reinforce a chronology, an axiom of corroborative evidence. Ideally, archaeological materials used for dating a site should complement each other and provide a means of cross-checking. Conclusions drawn from just one unsupported technique are usually regarded as unreliable.

== Synchronism ==
The fundamental problem of chronology is to synchronize events. By synchronizing an event it becomes possible to relate it to the current time and to compare the event to other events. Among historians, a typical need is to synchronize the reigns of kings and leaders in order to relate the history of one country or region to that of another. For example, the Chronicon of Eusebius (325 A.D.) is one of the major works of historical synchronism. This work has two sections. The first contains narrative chronicles of nine different kingdoms: Chaldean, Assyrian, Median, Lydian, Persian, Hebrew, Greek, Peloponnesian, Asian, and Roman. The second part is a long table synchronizing the events from each of the nine kingdoms in parallel columns.

By comparing the parallel columns, the reader can determine which events were contemporaneous, or how many years separated two different events. To place all the events on the same time scale, Eusebius used an Anno Mundi (A.M.) era, meaning that events were dated from the supposed beginning of the world as computed from the Book of Genesis in the Hebrew Pentateuch. According to the computation Eusebius used, this occurred in 5199 B.C. The Chronicon of Eusebius was widely used in the medieval world to establish the dates and times of historical events. Subsequent chronographers, such as George Syncellus (died circa 811), analyzed and elaborated on the Chronicon by comparing with other chronologies. The last great chronographer was Joseph Justus Scaliger (1540-1609) who reconstructed the lost Chronicon and synchronized all of ancient history in his two major works, De emendatione temporum (1583) and Thesaurus temporum (1606). Much of today's historical dating and chronology of the ancient world derive from these two works. Scaliger invented the concept of the Julian day, which is still used as the standard unified scale of time for both historians and astronomers.

In addition to the literary methods of synchronism used by traditional chronographers such as Eusebius, Syncellus and Scaliger, it is possible to synchronize events by archaeological or astronomical means. For example, the Eclipse of Thales, described in the first book of Herodotus can potentially be used to date the Lydian War because the eclipse took place during the middle of an important battle in that war. Likewise, various eclipses and other astronomical events described in ancient records can be used to astronomically synchronize historical events. Another method to synchronize events is the use of archaeological findings, such as pottery, to do sequence dating.

== See also ==
=== Examples ===
- Parian Chronicle
- List of timelines – specific chronologies
- Timelines of world history – overall historical chronology

=== Christian chronology ===
- Dionysius Exiguus' Easter table
- Easter
- Lunar cycle
- Millennium question
- Paschal full moon
- Solar cycle

=== General ===
- Annals
- French revolutionary era
- Hispanic era
- Historiography
- Traditional Jewish chronology

=== Fiction writing ===
Aspects and examples of non-chronological story-telling:

- Flashback
- Flashforward
- Linearity (writing)
- Reverse chronology
