= 1420s BC =

The 1420s BC is a decade that lasted from 1429 BC to 1420 BC.

== Events and trends ==
- The Egyptian Empire signs a peace treaty with the Kingdom of Mitanni (approximately 1420s BC). Pharaoh Thutmose IV marries Mutemwiya, daughter of the Mitanni king Artatama I, and recognizes their borders. Both kings frequently refer to one another as 'beloved brothers', and grant one another great gifts.
- Crete changed into the Mycenae civilization (approximately 1420s BC)—start of the Mycenaean period.

== Significant people ==
- Thutmose III, pharaoh of the eighteenth dynasty of Egypt (1503 BC–1426 BC)
- Thutmose IV, pharaoh of Egypt, (1401 BC–1391 BC or 1397 BC–1388 BC)
- Amenhotep II, pharaoh of Egypt, (1427 BC–1401 BC)
