= 1560s BC =

Decade

The 1560s BC was a decade lasting from January 1, 1569, BC to December 31, 1560, BC.

== Events and trends ==
- 1567 BC—Egypt: End of Fifteenth Dynasty, end of Sixteenth Dynasty, end of Seventeenth Dynasty, start of Eighteenth Dynasty.

== Significant people ==
- Reuben, son of Jacob (1568–1445 BC).
- Ahmose I, Pharaoh and founder of the 18th Dynasty of Egypt (1570–1546 BC).
