= 1160s BC =

The 1160s BC is a decade that lasted from 1169 BC to 1160 BC.

== Events and trends ==
- 1166 BC—The start of the Discordian calendar and within Discordianism the date of the Curse of Greyface.
- 1162 BC—The statue of Marduk is taken from Babylon by Elamite conquerors.
- 1160 BC—Ancient Nubia regains independence from Egypt, after long having served as its vice-royalty since its annexation by Pharaoh Ahmose I.

== Significant people ==
- Ramesses V, Egyptian pharaoh
- Ashur-resh-ishi I, king of Assyria, is born (approximate date).
- Ramesses IX, pharaoh of Egypt, is born (approximate date).
- Ramesses VII, pharaoh of Egypt, is born (approximate date).
