= 1230s BC =

The 1230s BC is a decade that lasted from 1239 BC to 1230 BC.

== Events and trends ==
- 1230 BC – Battle of Nihriya
- 1234 BC – Theseus of Athens begins his 30-year reign (if the end of his reign is agreed to have ended in 1204 BC).
