= 1310s BC =

Decade

The 1310s BC is the decade that lasted from 1319 BC to 1310 BC.

== Events ==
- The Bhagavad Gita is written, according to Hindu traditions.

=== 1319 BC ===
- The reign of Ay comes to an end.
- (or 1306 BC)—Horemheb assumes the throne of Ancient Egypt.

=== 1317 BC ===
- Enlil-nirari succeeds his father as king of Assyria.

=== 1312 BC ===
==== June ====
- 24 (or April 13 1308 BC) – Mursili II launches a campaign against the Kingdom of Azzi-Hayasa.

== Significant people ==
- Ramesses I, pharaoh of Egypt, is born (approximate date).
- Seti I, pharaoh of Egypt, is born (approximate date).
