= 15th millennium BC =

Millennium between 15,000 BC and 14,001 BC

The 15th millennium BC spanned the years 15,000 BC to 14,001 BC. This millennium is during the Upper Paleolithic period. It is impossible to precisely date events that have occurred during this millennium, and all dates associated with this millennium are estimates mostly based on geological analysis, anthropological analysis, and radiometric dating.

== Inventions, discoveries, and innovations ==
- United States: Probable presence of humans at the Cactus Hill site in Virginia, where stone artifacts and possibly hearths dating to before the Clovis culture have been found.
- Middle East: Probable domestication of the dog.
- Italy: Development of Gravettian civilizations in Italy and Eastern Europe.
- Europe: Peak of rock art.
- France, Spain: Development of Magdalenian civilizations (development of craftsmanship based on bone materials and the quality of furniture and wall art).
