= 1110s BC =

The 1110s BC is a decade that lasted from 1119 BC to 1110 BC.

== Events and trends ==
- 1115 BC—Tiglath-Pileser I becomes king of Assyria.
- 1111 BC—Pharaoh Ramesses IX of Egypt dies, is buried in KV6, and succeeded by Ramesses X, possibly his son.
- 1107 BC—Pharaoh Ramesses X of Egypt dies and is succeeded by Ramesses XI, probably his son, as 10th and final pharaoh of the Twentieth Dynasty of Egypt and last ruler of the New Kingdom of Egypt. Tomb KV18 has been prepared for Ramesses X but is apparently not used.
