= 1330s BC =

The 1330s BC is a decade that lasted from 1339 BC to 1330 BC.

== Events and trends ==
- 1336 BC: Pharaoh Akhenaten of Egypt names Smenkhkare as a co-ruler.
- 1336 BC: Tutankhaten becomes Pharaoh of Egypt and marries Ankhesenpaaten, his half sister and cousin as well as a daughter of his predecessor Akhenaten.
- c. 1336 BC: Amarna period in Ancient Egypt ends.
- 1336 BC – 1327 BC: Inner coffin of Tutankhamun's sarcophagus, from the tomb of Tutankhamun, Valley of the Kings near Deir el-Bahri is made. 18th dynasty. It is now in Egyptian Museum, Cairo.
- 1331 BC: Pharaoh Tutankhaten of Egypt renames himself to Tutankhamun and abandons Amarna, returning the capital to Thebes.

== Significant people ==
- 1338 BC: Queen Tiy of Egypt, Chief Queen of Amenhotep III and matriarch of the Amarna family, vanishes from the historical record. Presumed death.
- 1337 BC: Queen Nefertiti of Egypt vanishes from the historical record. Presumed death.
- 1334 BC: Death of Smenkhkare, Pharaoh of Egypt and co-ruler with Akhenaten. Alternative date is 1333 BC
- 1334 BC: Death of Akhenaten, Pharaoh of Egypt. Alternative date is 1333 BC
