= 1170s BC =

The 1170s BC is a decade that lasted from 1179 BC to 1170 BC.

== Events and trends ==
- Late Bronze Age collapse when between 1206 and 1150 BC, the cultural collapse of the Mycenaean kingdoms, the Hittite Empire in Anatolia and Syria, and the New Kingdom of Egypt in Syria and Canaan interrupted trade routes and severely reduced literacy. In Greece the Late Bronze Age polities were replaced, after a hiatus, by the isolated village cultures of the Greek Dark Ages (ca. 1100–800 BC).
- 1180–1178 BC—Collapse of the Hittite Empire. Their capital, Hattusa, falls around or slightly after 1180 BC.
- 1178 BC, April 16—A solar eclipse occurs over the Ionian Sea. This may have marked the return of Odysseus, King of Ithaca, to his kingdom after the Trojan War. He discovers a number of suitors competing to marry his wife Penelope, whom they believe to be a widow, in order to succeed him on the throne. He organizes their slaying and re-establishes himself on the throne. The date is surmised from a passage in Homer's Odyssey, which reads, "The Sun has been obliterated from the sky, and an unlucky darkness invades the world." This happens in the context of a new moon, a necessary precondition for a full solar eclipse, and at noon, the computed time of the solar eclipse of April 16, 1178 BC. In 2008, to investigate, Dr Marcelo O. Magnasco, an astronomer at Rockefeller University, and Constantino Baikouzis, of the Observatorio Astrónomico de La Plata in Argentina, looked for more clues. Within the text, they interpreted three definitive astronomical events: there was a new moon on the day of the slaughter (as required for a solar eclipse); Venus was visible and high in the sky six days before; and the constellations Pleiades and Boötes were both visible at sunset 29 days before. Since these events recur at different intervals, this particular sequence only occurs once in 2000 years. The researchers found only one occurrence of this sequence between 1250 and 1115 BC, the 135-year spread around the putative date for the fall of Troy. It happened to coincide with the eclipse of April 16, 1178 BC.
- Battle of the Delta, circa 1175 BC, when the Egyptian pharaoh Ramesses III repulsed a major sea invasion by the Sea Peoples.

== Significant people ==
- Odysseus of Troy's 10-year trip home was through the 1170s
- Achilles died during the Trojan War.
