= 1530s BC =

The 1530s BC was a decade lasting from January 1, 1539 BC to December 31, 1530 BC.

== Events and trends ==
- 1539 BC—End of Seventeenth Dynasty of Egypt, start of the Eighteenth Dynasty.
- 1539 BC—Approximate first use of the Valley of the Kings.
- 1534 BC—The oldest dated star chart was made in Ancient Egypt.
- 1531 BC— Joseph interprets dreams of the Pharaoh, is released from prison and becomes second in Egypt next only to the Pharaoh himself.
- 1530 BC—End of the First Dynasty of Babylon and the start of the Kassite Dynasty—see History of Iraq.
