= 1140s BC =

The 1140s BC is a decade that lasted from 1149 BC to 1140 BC.

== Events and trends ==
- 1149–1145 BC – Reign of Pharaoh Ramesses V of the Twentieth Dynasty of Egypt.

== Significant people ==
- Tiglath-Pileser I, king of Assyria, is born (approximate date).
