= Timelines of Big History =

The following is a list of timeline articles:

== Prehistory ==
- For events dating from the formation of the universe see: Timeline of the universe (Chronology of the universe)
- For events dating from the formation of the planet to the rise of modern humans see: Timeline of natural history, Timeline of the evolutionary history of life and Timeline of human evolution.
- For events dating from the first appearance of Homo sapiens to before the invention of writing see: Timeline of prehistory

== History ==
These timelines of world history detail recorded events since the creation of writing roughly 5000 years ago to the present day.

- For events from c. 3200 BC – c. 500 see: Timeline of ancient history
- For events from c. 500 – c. 1499, see: Timeline of post-classical history
- For events from c. 1500, see: Timelines of modern history
- For events from c. 1500 – c. 1899 see: Timeline of geopolitical changes (1500–1899)
- For events from 1900 to 1999 see: Timeline of geopolitical changes (1900–1999)
- For events from 2000 to the present see: Timeline of geopolitical changes (2000–present)

== Future ==
For events from the 21st century to the 30th century see: 3rd millennium

For events from the 3rd millennium to 10^10^10^56 see: Timeline of the far future

== See also ==
- ChronoZoom
- Human history
- List of years
- List of decades, centuries, and millennia
