= 1060s BC =

Decade

The 1060s BC is a decade that lasted from 1069 BC to 1060 BC.

== Events and trends ==
- c.1069 BC – End of New Kingdom of Egypt and start of the Third Intermediate Period of Egypt and Twenty-first Dynasty of Egypt, founded by Smendes.
- 1068 BC – Codrus, legendary King of Athens, dies in battle against Dorian invaders after a reign of 21 years. Athenian tradition considers him the last King to have held absolute power. Modern historians consider him the last King whose life account is part of Greek mythology. He is succeeded by his son Medon.
