= 14th millennium BC =

Millennium between 14,000 BC and 13,001 BC

The 14th millennium BC spanned the years 14,000 BC to 13,001 BC. This millennium is during the Upper Paleolithic period. It is impossible to precisely date events that happened during this millennium, and all dates associated with this millennium are estimates mostly based on geological analysis, anthropological analysis, and radiometric dating.

== Inventions, discoveries, and innovations ==
- Japan: Beginning of the ancient Jōmon period (until 10,000 BCE), invention of pottery and signs of Mesolithic (possibly Neolithic) civilisation by the Proto-Ainu.
- United States: Probable presence of humans at the Meadowcroft Rockshelter site in Pennsylvania, where Lithic artefacts and hearths were found.
- Development of the magdalénian civilisations in Western Europe.
- Development of microliths in Europe.
- France: Lascaux Cave, a veritable gallery of rock art, also known as the "Sistine Chapel of the Palaeolithic" because of its wealth of cave paintings.
- Germany: Hamburg culture of the Epigravettian type, (a. 13,500 BC – c. 11,200 BC), characterised by prongs and tools used as chisels in the working of horns. It spread from northern France to southern Scandinavia in the north and to Poland in the east.
- In a cave located in eastern Morocco, a blade-making tradition of unclear origin was supplanted around the 14th millennium BCE by the earliest phase of what would become a prolonged sequence of Iberomaurusian cultural developments.
