= 1070s BC =

Decade

The 1070s BC is a decade that lasted from 1079 BC to 1070 BC.

== Events and trends ==
- 1079 BC—Death of Zhou cheng wang, king of the Zhou dynasty of China.
- 1078 BC—Zhou kang wang becomes king of the Zhou dynasty of China.
- c.1078 or 1077 BC—Pharaoh Ramesses XI of Egypt dies as the 10th and final pharaoh of the Twentieth Dynasty of Egypt (according to many sources) and last ruler of the New Kingdom of Egypt. He is succeeded by Smendes.

== Significant people ==
- Psusennes I, pharaoh of Egypt, is born (approximate date).
- Saul, king of Israel, is born (approximate date).
