= 1030s BC =

Decade

The 1030s BC is a decade that lasted from 1039 BC to 1030 BC.

== Events and trends ==
- 1039 BC — Neferkare Amenemnisu, king of Egypt, dies.
- c. 1039 BC — End of the Rebellion of the Three Guards in China. King Cheng subdues the hostile kingdom of Yan near the Bohai Sea, the last group opposed to the Zhou dynasty.
- 1031 BC — Shalmaneser II becomes King of Assyria
- c. 1030 BC — The Belknap Volcano erupts in the State of Oregon.
- c. 1030 BC — Beginning of Saul's reign, first king of the Kingdom of Israel

== Significant people ==
- 1107 BC—David born
