= 1430s BC =

The 1430s BC is a decade that lasted from 1439 BC to 1430 BC.

== Events and trends ==
- 1437 BC—Legendary King Erichthonius I of Athens dies after a reign of 50 years and is succeeded by his son Pandion I.
- 1430s - The Hittite Empire begins their main expansion.
