= 1010s BC =

Decade

The 1010s BC is a decade that lasted from 1019 BC to 1010 BC.

== Events and trends ==
- 1019 BC - Reign of Shalmaneser II ends, succeeded by his son Ashur-nirari IV.
- 1013 BC - Ashur-nirari IV is succeeded by his uncle, Ashur-rabi II, who ruled for 41 years, one of the longest reigns of an Assyrian monarch.
- 1012 BC—Acastus, Archon of Athens, dies after a reign of 36 years and is succeeded by his son Archippus.
- A solar eclipse was seen in Ugarit from 6:09 PM to 6:39 PM, May 9, 1012, BC.
- 1010 BC—Uzzah, a citizen of Judah, dies, believed to have been smitten by God for violating divine law by touching the Ark of the Covenant.

== Significant people ==
- Siamun, pharaoh of Egypt, is born (approximate date).
