= 1610s BC =

Decade

The 1610s BC was a decade lasting from January 1, 1619 BC to December 31, 1610 BC.

== Events and trends ==
- 1610 - A volcanic eruption at Thera island destroyed the ancient city of Akrotiri.
- 1618 - The Chinese records a famine accompanied with frost in July. They also recorded a dim sun and yellow fog during this time.

== Significant people ==
- King Tang of Shang dynasty China (1617 BC–1588 BC)
