= 1260s BC =

The 1260s BC is a decade that lasted from 1269 BC to 1260 BC.

== Events and trends ==
- c. 1263 BC—Ramses II, king of ancient Egypt, and Hattusilis III, king of the Hittites, sign the earliest known peace treaty.
- 1263 BC—The approximate date traditionally offered for the biblical Exodus of the Israelites from Egypt under the leadership of Moses.
