= 1220s BC =

The 1220s BC is a decade that lasted from 1229 BC to 1220 BC.

== Events and trends ==
- 1221 BC—Pharaoh Merneptah defeats a Libyan invasion.
