= 1580s BC =

The 1580s BC was a decade lasting from January 1, 1589 BC to December 31, 1580 BC.

== Events and trends ==
- The Egyptians invented a new and better calendar. It is based on both the moon and a star. They observed the annual appearance of the brightest star in the sky, Sirius. This calendar was more advanced than the Babylonian calendar.

== Significant people ==
- Erishum III, King of Assyria, 1598–1586 BC (traditional date), or ca. 1580–1567 BC (newer dating)
- Actaeus, King of Athens, first King of Athens according to the Parian Chronicle succeeded in the throne by Cecrops I
- Pharaoh Sekhemre-wahkhaw Rahotep of Upper Egypt
- Hyksos Pharaoh Apepi of Lower Egypt
