= 1510s BC =

The 1510s BC was a decade lasting from January 1, 1519 BC to December 31, 1510 BC. Most of the written records that survive from this decade come from archaeological sites in China, South Asia, the Mediterranean, and North Africa. This decade sits towards the end of the Mediterranean Bronze Age, characterized by the development of new technology and cultural exchange between civilizations in this region.

== Significant people ==
- Amenhotep I
- Ahmose-Nefertari
- Zhong Ren
- Burna-buriash I
- Hantili II
- Amyntas I
