= 1620s BC =

Decade

The 1620s BC was a decade lasting from January 1, 1629, BC to December 31, 1620, BC.

== Events and trends ==
- 1627 BC—Beginning of a period of cooling of the world climate lasting several years, recorded in tree-rings all over the world. Various volcanic eruptions have been suggested for the cause of this climatic event; the Minoan eruption of Thera, the Avellino eruption of Mount Vesuvius, or the eruption of Mount Aniakchak.
- 1625 BC—Samsu-Ditana becomes King of Babylon (middle chronology).
- 1621 BC—Lullaia becomes the King of Assyria.
- 1620 BC—Mursili I becomes King of the Hittite Empire (middle chronology).
