= 1370s BC =

The 1370s BC refers to the period between 1379 BC and 1370 BC, the 1370s was the third decade of the 14th century BC.

== Events and trends ==
- The cutting down of the oak log that the Egtved Girl (in today's Denmark) was buried in. It is dated to the summer of 1370 BC.
- c. 1375 BC—Minoan culture ends on Crete.
- c. 1375 BC—Site of palace complex Knossos is abandoned.

== Significant people ==
- Akhenaten is thought to have been born in this decade.
- Nefertiti is thought to have been born in this decade.
