= 1090s BC =

Decade

The 1090s BC is a decade that lasted from 1099 BC to 1090 BC.

== Events and trends ==
- 1090 BC—or the Year of the Hyenas, in the reign of Ramesses XI, was a year of catastrophe. There was a very significant drop in the flow of river Nile waters, caused by a spike in climate normality. This led to significant starvation of the Egyptians, loss of faith in the religion as conducted by the high priest and collapse not only of the state in Egypt but also its economy, leading to a ten-year period of chaos. This led to the emergence of tomb robbers and the end of the Valley of the Kings as a burial site.

== Significant people ==
- King Wen of Zhou
- Ramesses XI
