= 1270s BC =

The 1270s BC was a decade that lasted from 1279 BC to 1270 BC.

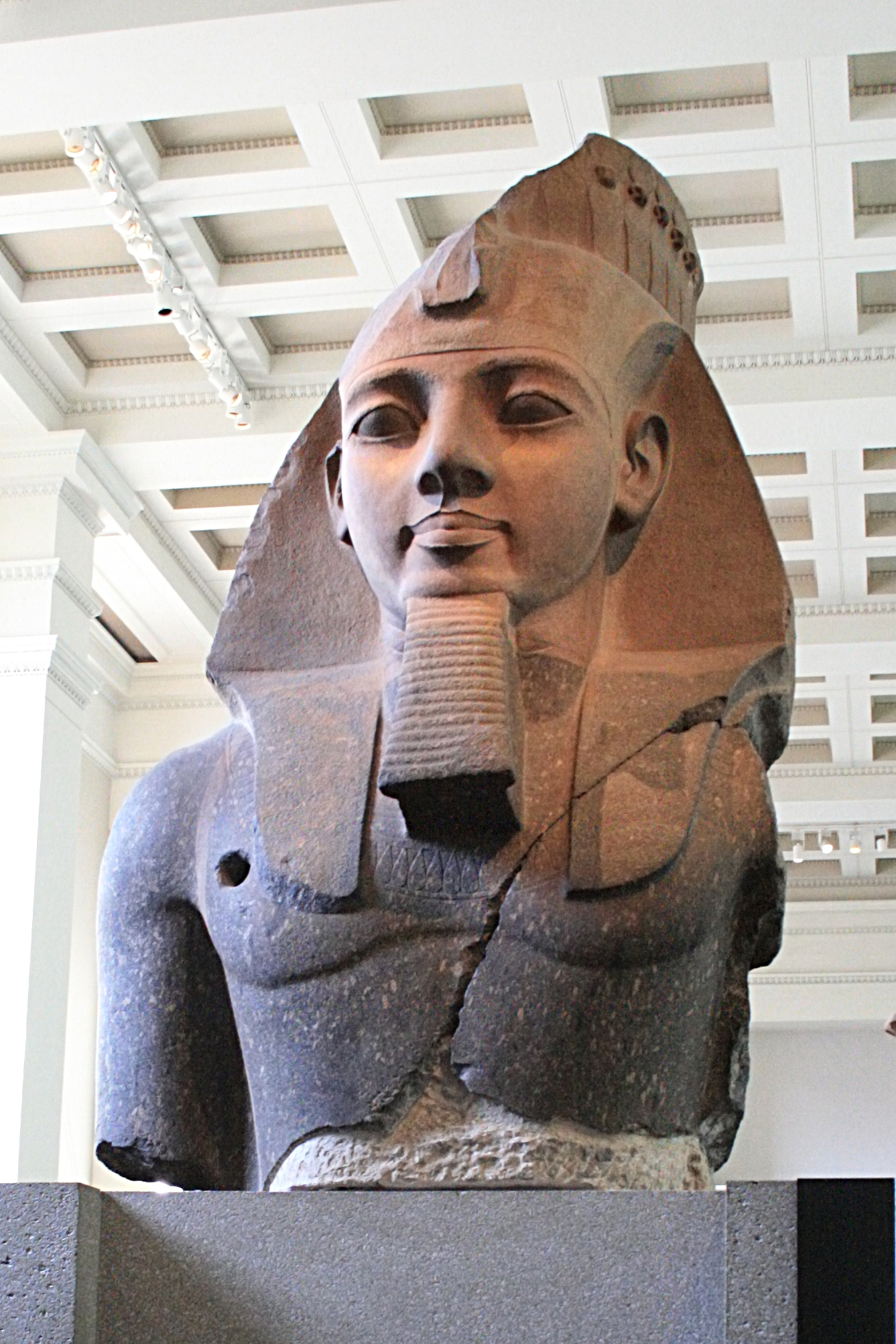
Statue of Ramesses II (19th Dynasty)

== Events and trends ==
- 1279 BC—Pharaoh Seti I dies after an 11-year reign.
- c. 1279 BC—Troy VI, speculated to be the city mentioned in Homer's Iliad, is presumed to have been destroyed by Greek armies.
- c. 1279 BC—Ramesses II (19th Dynasty) becomes pharaoh of Egypt. During his reign he builds a new capital on the eastern Nile Delta which he, renames Pi-Ramesses – the "House of Ramesses". The capital is created as a center of Egyptian power in the North.
- c. 1279 BC – 1213 BC—Temple of Ramesses II in Abu Simbel in Nubia (19th Dynasty) is built. The wall painting of Queen Nefertari making an offering to the god Isis in the tomb of Nefertari is made. The tomb is located in the Valley of the Queens in Egypt.
- c. 1279 BC – 1213 BC—Temple of Amun, Mut and Khons at Luxor are built.
- 1278 BC—Ramesses II defeats the Shardana sea pirates and nomads on the western frontier.
- 1275 BC—Ramesses II marches his army north to secure Amurru and makes a bold statement of intent to the Hittites, who have been fighting internecine skirmishes in the north, east and west of their realm for many years.
- 1274 BC—The Battle of Kadesh (or Battle of Qadesh) in Syria, regarded as the largest (5,000–6,000) chariot vs. chariot battle in antiquity. The end of the battle is followed by some 15 years of border warfare ended by the signing of the earliest known peace treaty between the Hittites and Egyptians, the Treaty of Kadesh.
- c. 1274 BC—Ramesses II (the Great) fights a number of campaigns in Canaan and Syria, with the aim of recovering territories lost in the post-Kadesh revolts.
- 1274 BC—Shalmaneser I becomes king of the Assyrian Empire.

== Significant people ==
- Ramesses II, pharaoh of Egypt (1279 BC–1213 BC)
- Tukulti-Ninurta I, king of Assyria (approximate date)
