= 1480s BC =

The 1480s BC was a decade lasting from January 1, 1489 BC to December 31, 1480 BC.

== Events and trends ==
- 1487 BC—Amphictyon, son of Deucalion and Pyrrha, legendary King of Athens, dies after a reign of 10 years and is succeeded by Erichthonius I of Athens, a grandson of Cranaus.
- 1481 BC—August 27—Lunar Saros 43 begins.
