= 1240s BC =

The 1240s BC is a decade that lasted from 1249 BC to 1240 BC.

== Events and trends ==
- c. 1240 BC—The Philistines expand their influence into Cyprus and Canaan.
- c. 1240 BC—The wimble and lathe are invented.

== Significant people ==
- Merneptah, pharaoh of Egypt, born (approximate date).

== In legend ==
- 1249 BC—Gideon conquers the Midianites.
- c. 1240 BC—The Argonauts capture Troy.
