= 1680s BC =

Decade

The 1680s BC was a decade lasting from January 1, 1689 BC to December 31, 1680 BC.

== Events and trends ==
- Egypt—Start of the Sixteenth Dynasty.
- Egypt—Development of leavened bread (date approximate).

== Significant people ==
- 1686 BC—Death of Hammurabi (short chronology)
- 1684 BC—Death of Érimón, Irish legend
