= 1380s BC =

Decade

The 1380s BC refers to the period between 1389 BC and 1380 BC, the 1380s was the second decade of the 14th century BC.

== Events and Trends ==
- Decline of the Minoan Culture in Crete.
- Pharaoh Amenhotep III of Egypt marries Tiye, his Chief Queen.
- Amenhotep III attempts to connect the Nile and the Red Sea with a canal, this however would not be done successfully until almost 1000 years later with the opening of the Canal of the Pharaohs.

== Significant people ==
- Amenhotep III - Pharaoh of Egypt.
