= 1390s BC =

The 1390s BC is a decade that lasted from 1399 BC to 1390 BC.

== Events and trends ==
- 1397 BC—Pandion I, legendary King of Athens, dies after a reign of 40 years and is succeeded by his son Erechtheus II of Athens.
- c. 1390 BC–1352 BC: Queen Tiy, bust from Kom Medinet el-Ghurab (near el-Lahun) was made. 18th dynasty. It is now in Staatliche Museen zu Berlin, Stiftung Preußischer Kulturbesitz, Ägyptisches Museum.
- Hittites ruled by King Arnuwanda I (until 1360).

== Significant people ==
- 1398 BC—Birth of Tiy to Egyptian nobleman Yuya and his wife Tjuyu. She later becomes the Chief Queen of Pharaoh Amenhotep III of Egypt and the matriarch of the Amarna family (approximate date).
- c. 1390 BC—Pharaoh Amenhotep III (18th dynasty) starts to rule.
