= 1570s BC =

The 1570s BC is a decade that began on January 1, 1579, BC, and ended on December 31, 1570, BC.

== Events and trends ==
- 1570 BC — The Second Intermediate Period of Egypt ends and the New Kingdom of Egypt begins.
- 1572 BC — The death of Moses, according to Thrasyllus of Mendes, an Egyptian mathematician and astronomer who lived in the reign of Tiberius

== Significant people ==
- Kamose, last Pharaoh of the Seventeenth Dynasty of Egypt (1573–1570 BC).
- Ahmose I, Pharaoh and founder of the Eighteenth Dynasty of Egypt (1570–1546 BC).
- 1573 BC — Death of Eber, son of Salah (b. 2037 BC) according to the Hebrew calendar
