= 1290s BC =

The 1290s BC is a decade that lasted from 1299 BC to 1290 BC.

== Events and trends ==
- c. 1295 BC–1186 BC–Great Temple of Amun, Karnak, is built in the New Kingdom of Egypt.
- c. 1294 BC–Egyptian–Hittite Wars.
- 1292 BC—Coronation of Pharaoh Ramesses I of Egypt marks the end of the Eighteenth Dynasty and start of the Nineteenth Dynasty of Egypt.

== Significant people ==
- Ramesses I, Egyptian pharaoh, crowned.
- Shalmaneser I, king of Assyria, born (approximate date).
- Ramesses II ("the Great"), Egyptian pharaoh, born (approximate date).
