= 1660s BC =

Decade

The 1660s BC was a decade lasting from January 1, 1669 BC to December 31, 1660 BC.

== Events and trends ==
- 1664 BC: Gravitational interactions with Saturn result in the centaur Chiron being forced into a different orbit.
- 1662 BC—May 22—Lunar Saros 33 begins.

== Significant people ==
- 1661 BC: Iptar-Sin became the King of Assyria.
- 1664 BC: Death of Arpachshad, son of Shem, son of Noah, according to the Hebrew calendar.
