= 1630s BC =

Decade

The 1630s BC was a decade lasting from January 1, 1639 BC to December 31, 1630 BC.

== Events and trends ==
- 1633 BC—May 2—Lunar Saros 34 begins.
- Before 1630 BC – 1500 BC—Landscape (Spring fresco), wall painting with areas of modern reconstruction from Akrotiri, Thera, Cyclades, is made. It is now at National Archaeological Museum, Athens.

== Significant lifeforms ==
- 1637 BC—Death of Abraham according to Jewish calculations (2,123 years after biblical creation)
- 1634 BC—Death of Salah, son of Arpachshad, according to the Hebrew calendar
