= 1440s BC =

The 1440s BC is a decade that lasted from 1449 BC to 1440 BC.

== Events and trends ==
- 1449 BC: Fíachu Labrainne, Milesians' High King of Ireland, is killed and succeeded by Eochu Mumu
- c. 1448 BC: The Gnbtyw people (Genebtyw or Genebtyu) first appear in Ganibatum during the 32nd year of the reign of Thutmose III, the sixth Pharaoh of the Eighteenth dynasty of Egypt
- 1445–1444 BC: The Book of Leviticus is written.
- c. 1440 BC: first recorded urban settlement on or near Mount Yamanlar which controlled the Gulf of İzmir
