= 1520s BC =

The 1520s BC was a decade lasting from January 1, 1529 BC to December 31, 1520 BC.

== Events ==
- 1528 Birth of Dan
- 1525 BC—End of Fifteenth dynasty of Egypt.
- 1522 BC—Jacob migrates to Egypt, settling in the Land of Goshen, according to the Hebrew calendar.
- 1521 BC—April 24—Lunar Saros 36 begins.
