= 1210s BC =

The 1210s BC is a decade that lasted from 1219 BC to 1210 BC.

== Events and trends ==
- 1213 BC–1203 BC—Merneptah Stele makes the earliest recorded mention of Israel.
- 1213 BC—Theseus, legendary King of Athens, is deposed and succeeded by Menestheus, great-grandson of Erechtheus and second cousin of Theseus' father Aegeus. Menestheus is reportedly assisted by Castor and Polydeuces of Sparta, who want to reclaim their sister Helen from her first husband Theseus. The latter seeks refuge in Skyros, whose King Lycomedes is an old friend and ally. Lycomedes, however, considers his visitor a threat to the throne and proceeds to assassinate him (though other accounts place these events a decade later, in the 1200s BC).
- c.1213 BC—Death of Ramesses II ("the Great"), Egyptian Pharaoh.
- 1210 BC—Accession of legendary Magadhan king Subrata of the Brihadrata dynasty.

== Significant people ==
- Merneptah, Pharaoh of the Nineteenth Dynasty of Egypt (1213 BC–1203 BC)
- Ramesses III, pharaoh of Egypt, born (approximate date).
