= 1400s BC (decade) =

The 1400s BC is a decade that lasted from 1409 BC to 1400 BC.

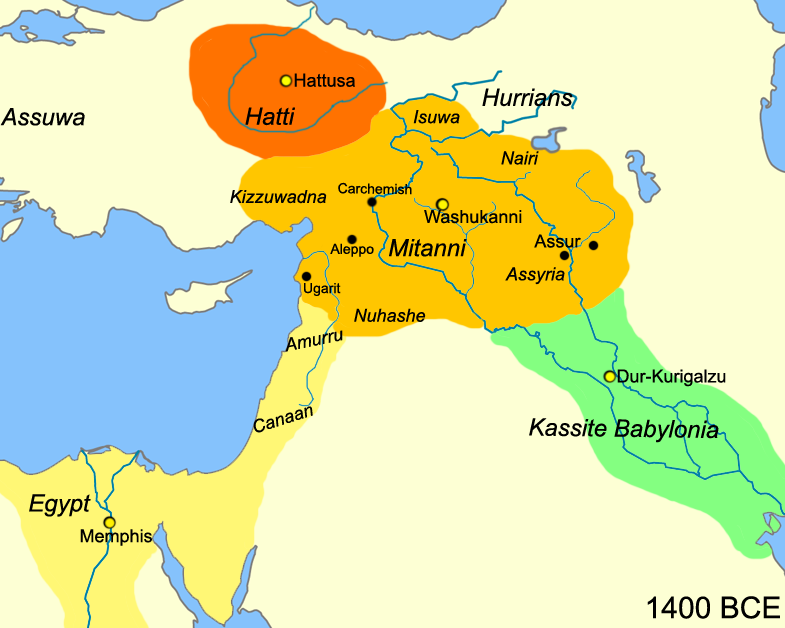
Near East in 1400 BCE.

== Events and trends ==
- April 16, 1409 BC Lunar Saros 38 begins.
- 1400 BC – Palace of Minos destroyed by fire.
- 1400 BC – Estimation: Thebes, capital of Egypt becomes the largest city of the world, taking the lead from Memphis in Egypt.
- c. 1400 BC – Assyrians became very powerful.
- c. Beginning of Mycenaean era.
- c. 1400 BC – The center of political and cultural power in the Aegean has shifted from Crete to mainland Greece, which at that time is home to wealthy warrior-kings.
- c. 1400 BC – 1350 BC – Garden of Nebamum (Pond in a Garden) wall painting from the tomb of Nebamum, Thebes. Eighteenth dynasty of Egypt. It is now kept in The British Museum, London.
- c. 1400 BC – Lion Gate at Hattushash (near modern Boghazkeui, Turkey) is made.
- c. 1400 BC – 1200 BC – Two women with a child, found in the palace at Mycenae, Greece, are made. It is now at National Archaeological Museum of Athens.
- Linear A reaches its peak of popularity.
- The height of the Canaanite town of Ugarit.
