= 1590s BC =

The 1590s BC was a decade lasting from January 1, 1599 BC to December 31, 1590 BC.

== Events and trends ==
- ca. 1595 BC—Mursili I, king of the Hittites, sacks Babylon. This brings an end to the rule of the descendants of Hammurabi in that kingdom.

== Significant people ==
- 1597 BC—Aaron born to Amram and his wife Jochebed (traditional date)
