= 1320s BC =

The 1320s BC is a decade that lasted from 1329 BC to 1320 BC.

== Events ==
- 1323 BC – Death of Pharaoh Tutankhamun of Egypt. Ay succeeds him as pharaoh.
- 1324 BC – The Hittite Empire prince Zannanza was killed on his way to Egypt at the request of the Egyptian queen Ankhesenamun to become her husband and king of Egypt.
