= 1540s BC =

The 1540s BC was a decade lasting from January 1, 1549, BC to December 31, 1540, BC.

== Events and trends ==
- History of ancient Israel and Judah—earliest date for Ahmose I founding the Eighteenth dynasty of Egypt.

== Significant people ==
- 1545 BC—Ahmose I, Pharaoh and founder of the 18th Dynasty of Egypt, dies, according to the High Chronology.
