= 8th century BC =

One hundred years, from 800 BC to 701 BC

The 8th century BC started the first day of 800 BC and ended the last day of 701 BC. The 8th century BC was a period of great change for several historically significant civilizations. In Egypt, the 23rd and 24th dynasties lead to rule from Kingdom of Kush in the 25th Dynasty. The Neo-Assyrian Empire reaches the peak of its power, conquering the Kingdom of Israel as well as nearby countries.

Greece colonizes other regions of the Mediterranean Sea and Black Sea. Rome is founded in 753 BC, and the Etruscan civilization expands in Italy. The 8th century BC is conventionally taken as the beginning of Classical Antiquity, with the first Olympiad set at 776 BC, and the epics of Homer dated to between 750 and 650 BC.

Iron Age India enters the later Vedic period. Vedic ritual is annotated in many priestly schools in Brahmana commentaries, and the earliest Upanishads mark the beginning of Vedanta philosophy.

== Events ==
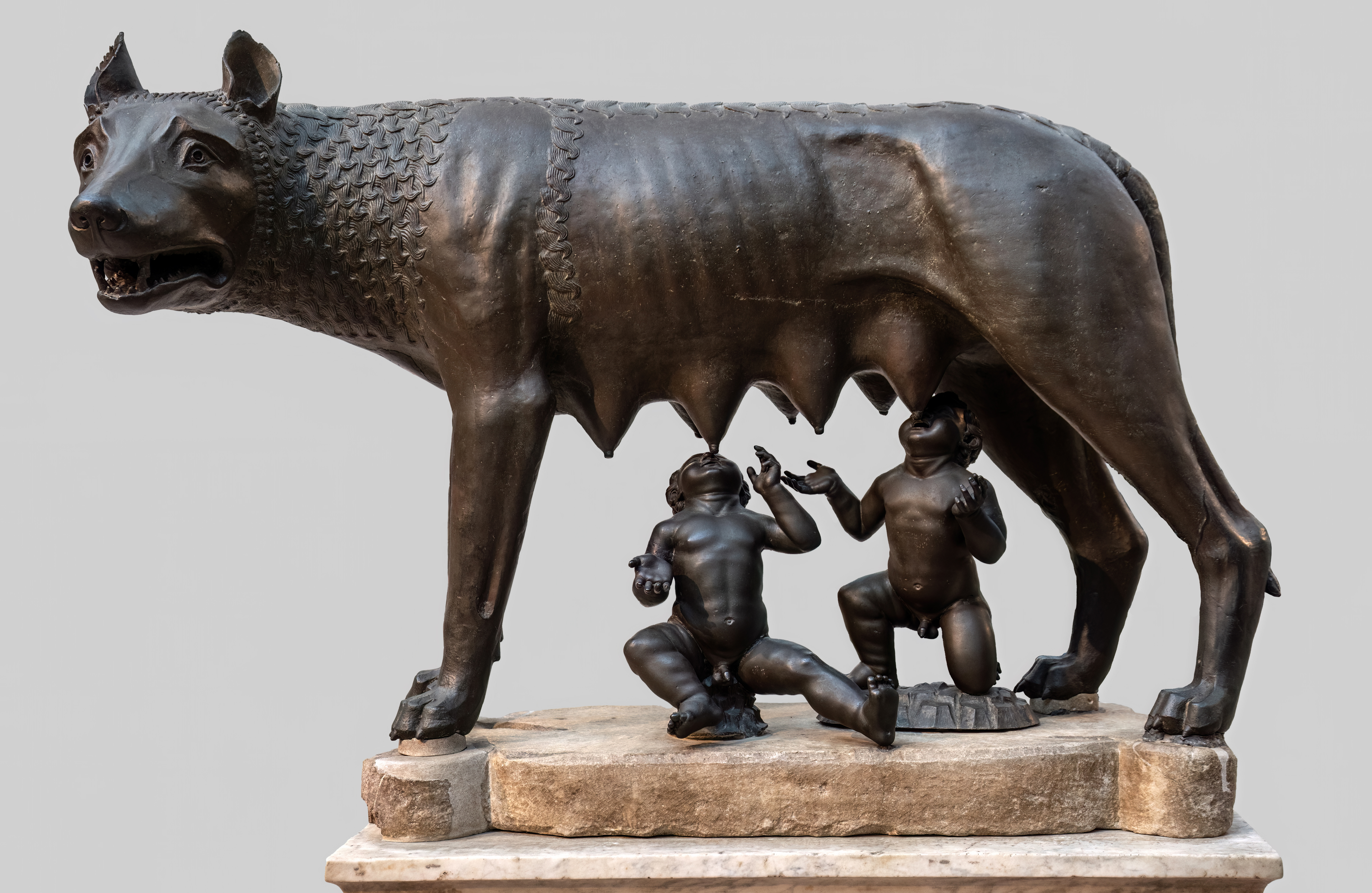
The bronze Capitoline Wolf suckles the infant twins Romulus and Remus, the twins added in the 15th century. They were the legendary founders of Rome.

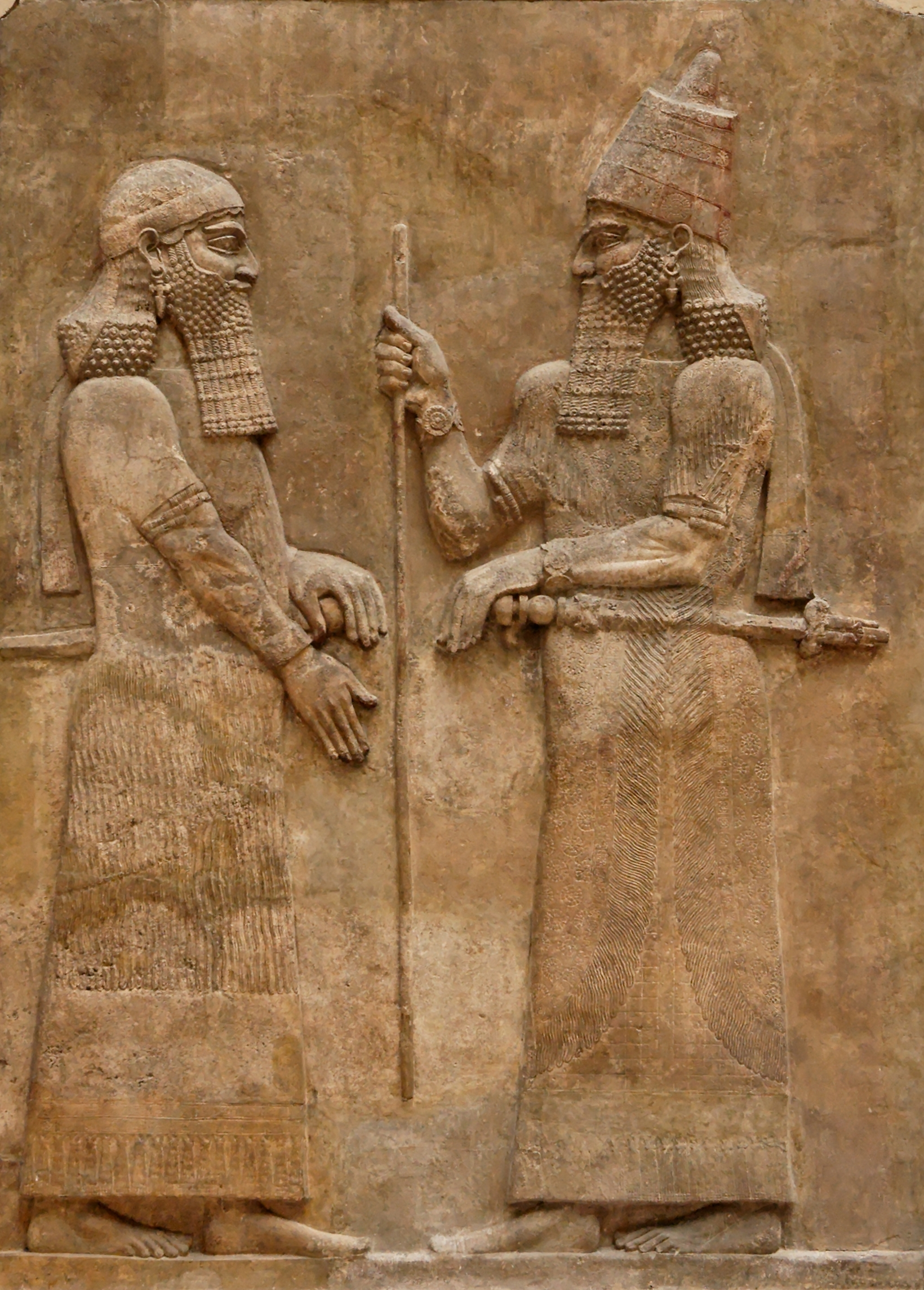
Sargon II, King of Assyria and conqueror of the Kingdom of Israel, depicted here with a dignitary

=== 790s BC ===
- Late 8th century BC: Earrings, crown and rosettes, from the tomb of Queen Yabay in Kalhu (modern Nimrud, Iraq) are made. They are now at Iraq Museum, Baghdad. Discovered in 1988.
- Second half of the 8th century BC: In the Kingdom of Judah, Jerusalem begins an expansion in population and size, going from a small town into a major city.
- 797 BC: Thespieus, King of Athens, dies after a reign of 27 years and is succeeded by his son Agamestor.

=== 780s BC ===
- 788 BC: The Cholas from India established a dynamic city port and industrial center at Sungai Batu in the Old Kedah Kingdom, located in what is now Malaysia or the Malay Peninsula. Large-scale iron smelting operations were carried out there, and the port served as an important entrepôt and trade center. Iron was the major commodity exported from Sungai Batu, with the Old Kedah Kingdom historically known by various names such as Kataha, Qalah, and Chie-Cha, among others. Excavation works at this ancient city are still ongoing.
- 783 BC: Shalmaneser IV succeeds his father Adad-nirari III as king of Assyria.
- 782 BC: Founding of Erebuni (Էրեբունի) by the orders of King Argishtis I at the site of current-day Yerevan.
- 782 BC: Death of King Xuan of Zhou, king of the Zhou dynasty of China.
- 781 BC: King You of Zhou becomes king of the Zhou dynasty of China.
- 780 BC: The first historic solar eclipse is recorded in China.

(Although Greece, Egypt, and other Eastern societies had mentioned solar and lunar eclipses, and had been counting their centuries on lunar and solar cycles, the mentioned solar eclipse lasted longer than previous records.)

=== 770s BC ===
- 778 BC: Agamestor, King of Athens, dies after a reign of 17 years and is succeeded by his son Aeschylus.
- 776 BC: retrospectively set as the first Olympiad. The history of the Olympic Games is believed to reach as far back as the 13th century BC.
- 774 BC: End of the reign of king Pygmalion of Tyre.
- 773 BC: Death of Shoshenq III, king of Egypt.
- 773 BC: Ashur-Dan III succeeds his brother Shalmaneser IV as king of Assyria.
- 772 BC: Pārśvanātha, 23rd Tirthankara of Jainism died and attained nirvana.
- 771 BC: End of the Western Zhou dynasty in China as "western" barbarian tribes sack the capital Hao. King You of Zhou is killed. Crown Prince Ji Yijiu escapes and will reign as King Ping of Zhou.
- 770 BC: Beginning of the Eastern Zhou dynasty in China as King Ping of Zhou becomes the first King of the Zhou to rule from the new capital of Chengzhou (today Luoyang).

=== 760s BC ===
- June 15, 763 BC: A solar eclipse on this date is used to fix the chronology of the Ancient Near East.
- Mid-8th century BC: Model of temple, found in the Sanctuary of Hera, Argos, is made. It is now at National Archeological Museum, Athens.

=== 750s BC ===
- 756 BC: Founding of Cyzicus.
- 755 BC: Ashur-nirari V succeeds Ashur-Dan III as king of Assyria.
- 755 BC: Aeschylus, King of Athens, dies after a reign of 23 years and is succeeded by Alcmaeon.
- 753 BC: Alcmaeon, King of Athens, dies after a reign of 2 years. He is replaced by Harops, elected Archon for a ten-year term.
- April 21, 753 BC: Rome founded by Romulus (according to tradition). Beginning of the Roman 'Ab urbe condita' calendar.

=== 740s BC ===
- February 26, 747 BC: Nabonassar becomes king of Babylon.
- 747 BC: Meles becomes king of Lydia.
- 747 BC: The Lusatian culture city at Biskupin is founded.
- 745 BC: The crown of Assyria is seized by Pul, who takes the name Tiglath-Pileser III.
- 743 BC: Duke Zhuang of the Chinese state of Zheng comes to power.
- 740 BC: Tiglath-Pileser III conquers the city of Arpad in Syria after two years of siege.
- 740 BC: Start of Ahaz's reign of Judah.

=== 730s BC ===
- 739 BC: Hiram II becomes king of Tyre.
- 738 BC: King Tiglath-Pileser III of Assyria invades Israel, forcing it to pay tribute.
- 734 BC: Syracuse (Sicily) was founded as a colony by Corinth.
- 734 BC: Naxus in Sicily founded as a colony of Chalcis in Euboea. (traditional date)
- 732 BC: Hoshea becomes the last king of Israel.
- 730 BC: Osorkon IV succeeds Sheshonq IV as king of the Twenty-second dynasty of Egypt.
- 730 BC: Piye succeeds his father Kashta as king of the Nubian kingdom of Napata.
- 730 BC: Mattan II succeeds Hiram II as king of Tyre.

=== 720s BC ===
- 728 BC: Piye invades Egypt, conquering Memphis, and receives the submission of the rulers of the Nile Delta. He founds the Twenty-fifth Dynasty of Egypt.
- 727 BC: Babylonia makes itself independent of Assyria.
- 724 BC: The Assyrians start a four-year siege of Tyre.
- 724 BC: The diaulos footrace introduced at the Olympics.
- 722 BC: Spring and Autumn period of China's history begins as King Ping of Zhou of the Zhou dynasty reigns in name only.
- 722 BC: Israel is conquered by Assyrian king Sargon II.
- 720 BC: End of the Assyrian siege of Tyre.

=== 710s BC ===
- 719 BC: King Huan of Zhou of the Zhou dynasty becomes ruler of China.
- 718 BC: Gyges becomes the ruler of Lydia.
- 717 BC: Assyrian king Sargon conquers the Hittite stronghold of Carchemish.
- 717 BC: Sargon II founds a new capital for Assyria at Dur-Sharrukin.
- 716 BC: Roman legend marks this as the date that Romulus ended his rule.
- 715 BC: Start of the reign of Roman King Numa Pompilius.
- 713 BC: Numa Pompilius reforms the Roman calendar.
- 712 BC: Numa Pompilius creates the office of Pontifex Maximus.

=== 700s BC ===
- 706 BC: Spartan immigrants found Taras (Tarentum, the modern Taranto) colony in southern Italy.
- 705 BC: Sennacherib succeeds Sargon II as king of Assyria.
- 704 BC: Sennacherib moves the capital of Assyria to Nineveh.
- 701 BC: King Hezekiah of Judah, backed by Egypt, revolts against king Sennacherib of Assyria. Sennacherib sacks many cities, but fails in his attempt to take Jerusalem.
- 700 BC: The Scythians start settling in Cimmerian areas, slowly replacing the previous inhabitants.
- 700 BC: End of the Villanovan culture in northern Italy and rise of the Etruscan civilization.
- 700 BC: The Upanishads, a sacred text of Hinduism, are written around this time.

=== Date unknown ===
- Greeks colonize the Mediterranean and Black Seas.
- Thraco-Cimmerian influence in Central Europe.
- Assyria conquers Damascus and Samaria.
- The state of Zhongli in China is founded.

== Notable people ==
=== Greece and Italy ===
- Thespieus, king of Athens, r. 824–797 BC
- Agamestor, king of Athens, r. 795–778 BC
- Aeschylus, king of Athens, r. 778–755 BC
- Alcmaeon, king of Athens, r. 755–753 BC
- Romulus, king of Rome, r. 753–716 BC
- Numa Pompilius, king of Rome, r. 715–672 BC

=== Near East and Egypt ===
- Shoshenq III, king of Egypt (22nd Dynasty), r. 837–798 BC
- Pygmalion, king of Tyre, b. 842 BC, r. 831–785/774 BC
- Adad-nirari III, king of Assyria, r. 811–783 BC
- Menua, king of Urartu, b. c. 850 BC, r. 810–786 BC
- Shoshenq IV, king of Egypt (22nd Dynasty), r. 798–785 BC
- Argishtis I, king of Urartu, b. 827 BC, r. 786–764 BC
- Pami, king of Egypt (22nd Dynasty), r. 785–778 BC
- Shalmaneser IV, king of Assyria, r. 783–773 BC
- Ashur-dan III, king of Assyria, r. 773–755 BC
- Shoshenq V, king of Egypt (22nd Dynasty), r. 767–730 BC
- Ithobaal II, king of Tyre, r. 760–739 BC
- Ashur-nirari V, king of Assyria, r. 755–745 BC
- Nabonassar, king of Babylon, r. 747–734 BC
- Tiglath-Pileser III, king of Assyria, b. 795 BC, r. 745–727 BC
- Piye, king of Napata and Egypt (25th Dynasty), r. 744–714 BC
- Jehoahaz II, king of Judah, b. 760 BC, r. 740–724 BC
- Hiram II, king of Tyre, r. 739–729 BC
- Hoshea, king of Israel, r. 732–722 BC
- Osorkon IV, king of Egypt (22nd Dynasty), r. 730–716 BC
- Mattan II, king of Tyre, r. 729 BC–unknown
- Shalmaneser V, king of Assyria, r. 727–722 BC
- Hezekiah, king of Judah, b. 740 BC, r. 724–687 BC
- Sargon II, king of Assyria, b. 760s BC, r. 722–705 BC
- Shebitku, king of Egypt (25th Dynasty), r. 714–705 BC
- Sennacherib, king of Assyria, b. 745 BC, r. 705–681 BC
- Shabaka, king of Egypt (25th Dynasty), r. 705–690 BC

=== East Asia ===
- Xuan, king of Zhou, r. 827–782 BC
- You, king of Zhou, b. 795 BC, r. 781–771 BC
- Ping, king of Eastern Zhou, r. 770–720 BC
- Huan, king of Eastern Zhou, r. 719–697 BC

== Inventions, discoveries, introductions ==
- Demotic writing appeared in Ancient Egypt.
- Greeks adopt alphabetic writing.
