= Timeline of geopolitical changes (before 1500) =

- Timeline of geopolitical changes (before 1500); Timeline of geopolitical changes (1500–1899); Timeline of geopolitical changes (1900–1999); Timeline of geopolitical changes (2000–present)

This is a timeline of geopolitical changes around the world prior to 1500. It includes dates of declarations of independence, changes in country name, changes of capital city or name, and changes in territorial ownership such as the annexation, occupation, cession, concession, or secession of land. Territorial conquests as a result of war are included on the timeline at the conclusion of major military campaigns, but changes in the course of specific battles and day-to-day operations are generally not included.

== Before the Common Era (BCE) ==
=== Fourth Millennium BCE ===
From the 4th Millennium BCE to the 2nd Millennium BCE, hundreds of proto-cities in the Near East, Egypt, and the Indus Valley transition into city-states. Records of those geopolitical changes are complicated by mythologization, historical revisionism, missing information, lack of corroborating primary sources, and lack of archeological evidence. Consequently, the tables in that range are not comprehensive.

Year	Event
Before c.3200 BCE	Prominent Sumerian city-states Eridu, Bad-tibira, Larak, Sippar, and Shuruppak exercise pre-dynastic kingship.
c. 3200 BCE	Protodynastic Egyptian Kings unify Upper Egypt's regional power centers of Thinis, Naqada, and Nekhen.
c. 3200 BCE	The First Dynasty of Kish is established in the Sumerian city of Kish.
c. 3200 BCE	The First Dynasty of Uruk is established in the Sumerian city of Uruk.
c. 3080 BCE	Narmer (or Menes) unites Lower Egypt and Upper Egypt under the First Dynasty of Egypt. Memphis becomes the capital of all Egypt.

=== Third Millennium BCE ===
Year	Event
c. 2879 BCE	Dương Vương establishes the Hồng Bàng dynasty in Vietnam.
c. 2860 BCE	Hotepsekhemwy establishes the Second Dynasty of Egypt.
27th century BCE	Mesannepada establishes the First Dynasty of Ur. Ur becomes the de facto capital of Sumer.
c. 2700 BCE	The Awan Dynasty is established in Elam.
c. 2686 BCE	Djoser establishes the Third Dynasty of Egypt, marking the beginning of The Old Kingdom of Egypt.
c. 2655 BCE	Sneferu establishes the Fourth Dynasty of Egypt.
25th century BCE	The Elamite Awan Dynasty conquers the Sumerian First Dynasty of Ur.
25th century BCE	The Second Dynasty of Kish takes control of Sumer from the Elamite Awan Dynasty. The capital is Kish.
25th century BCE	The Dynasty of Hamazi supersedes the Second Dynasty of Kish in Sumer. The capital is moved from Kish to Hamazi.
25th century BCE	Userkaf establishes the Fifth Dynasty of Egypt.
24th century BCE	The Second Dynasty of Uruk supersedes the Dynasty of Hamazi in Sumer. The capital is moved from Hamazi to Uruk.
24th century BCE	The Dynasty of Adab supersedes the Second Dynasty of Uruk in Sumer. The capital is moved from Uruk to Adab.
24th century BCE	The Dynasty of Adab splits after the death of Lugal-Anne-Mundu. Lagash, Akshak, and Umma appear to have regained independence.
24th century BCE	The Dynasty of Mari consolidates control of Sumer. Mari is its capital.
24th century BCE	The Third Dynasty of Kish supersedes the Dynasty of Mari in Sumer. The capital is moved from Mari to Kish.
24th century BCE	The Dynasty of Akshak supersedes the Third Dynasty of Kish in Sumer. The capital is moved from Kish to Akshak.
24th century BCE	The Fourth Dynasty of Kish supersedes the Dynasty of Akshak in Sumer. The capital is moved from Akshak to Kish.
c. 2380 BCE	The First Dynasty of Lagash supersedes the Fourth Dynasty of Kish in Sumer. The capital is moved from Kish to Lagash.
c. 2336 BCE	Teti establishes the Sixth Dynasty of Egypt.
Late 24th century BCE	Sargon of Akkad establishes the Akkadian Empire after conquering Sumer. Akkad is the capital.
c. 2333 BCE	Gojoseon is established on the Korean Peninsula.
c. 2193 BCE	The Akkadian Empire collapses after an invasion by the Gutian people.
c. 2181 BCE	The Old Kingdom of Egypt collapses, beginning the First Intermediate Period of Egypt.
c. 2175 BCE	Netjerkare Siptah establishes the Seventh Dynasty of Egypt.
c. 2165 BCE	Neferkare Pepiseneb establishes the Eighth Dynasty of Egypt.
c. 2160 BCE	Meryibre Khety establishes the Ninth Dynasty of Egypt. Henen-nesut becomes the capital of Lower Egypt.
c. 2130 BCE	Meryhathor establishes the Tenth Dynasty of Egypt in Lower Egypt.
c. 2130 BCE	Mentuhotep I establishes the Eleventh Dynasty of Egypt. Thebes becomes the capital of Upper Egypt.
c. 2112 BCE	Utu-hengal defeats the Gutians and establishes the Fifth Dynasty of Uruk.
c. 2070 BCE	Yu the Great establishes the Xia dynasty in China. Yangcheng and Zhenxun are the capitals.
c. 2055 BCE	The Middle Kingdom of Egypt is established.
c. 2047 BCE	Ur-Nammu establishes the Sumerian Third Dynasty of Ur. Ur is the capital.
c. 2025 BCE	Puzur-Ashur I establishes the Old Assyrian Empire. Assur is the capital.
c. 2004 BCE	The Third Dynasty of Ur collapses after an Elamite invasion

=== Second Millennium BCE ===
Year	Event
c. 1991 BCE	Amenemhat I establishes the Twelfth Dynasty of Egypt and builds Amenemhat-itj-tawy to be the new capital.
c. 1894 BCE	Sumu-abum establishes the First Babylonian Dynasty. Babylon is the capital.
c. 1810 BCE	Sumu-Epuh establishes Yamhad. Halab (Aleppo) is the capital.
c. 1803 BCE	Wegaf Khutawyre establishes the Thirteenth Dynasty of Egypt.
Early 18th century BCE	Hammurabi establishes the Babylonian Empire.
c. 1705 BCE	Nehesy establishes the Fourteenth Dynasty of Egypt. Avaris is the capital.
c. 1700 BCE	The Middle Kingdom of Egypt collapses, beginning the Second Intermediate Period of Egypt.
c. 1650 BCE	Salitis establishes the Fifteenth Dynasty of Egypt. Avaris is the capital.
c. 1620 BCE	Djehuti establishes the Sixteenth Dynasty of Egypt. Thebes is the capital.
c. 1600 BCE	Tang establishes the Shang dynasty in China. Yin is the capital.
c. 1580 BCE	Rahotep Sekhenrewahkhaw establishes the Seventeenth Dynasty of Egypt.
c. 1550 BCE	The New Kingdom of Egypt is established.
c. 1534 BCE	Agum II establishes the rule of the Kassites in Mesopotamia. Babylon becomes the capital.
c. 1534 BCE	Pharaoh Ahmose I establishes the Eighteenth Dynasty of Egypt.
c. 1390 BCE	Kurigalzu I a Kassite king in Mesopotamia moves the capital to Dur-Kurigalzu.
c. 1363 BCE	Ashur-uballit I establishes the Middle Assyrian Empire. Assur is the capital.
c. 1345 BCE	Pharaoh Akhenaten of the Eighteenth Dynasty of Egypt moves the capital to Amarna (Akhetaton).
c. 1332 BCE	Collapse of the Indus Valley civilisation.
1330s BCE	Pharaoh Tutankhamun of the Eighteenth Dynasty of Egypt moves the capital to Memphis.
c. 1295 BCE	Muwatalli II of the Hittite empire moves capital to Tarhuntassa.
c. 1292 BCE	Pharaoh Ramesses I establishes the Nineteenth Dynasty of Egypt.
c. 1272 BCE	Mursili III of the Hittite empire moves capital back to Hattusa.
c. 1243 BCE	Ashur-nadin-apli of the Middle Assyrian Empire moves capital back to Assur.
c. 1243 BCE	Tukulti-Ninurta I of the Middle Assyrian Empire moves capital to Kar-Tukulti-Ninurta.
c. 1230 BCE	Pharaoh Ramesses II builds a new capital for the Nineteenth Dynasty of Egypt at the site of Avaris and names it Pi-Ramesses Aa-nakhtu.
c. 1188 BCE	Pharaoh Setnakhte establishes the Twentieth Dynasty of Egypt.
c. 1184 BCE	Greeks destroy the city-state of Troy.
c. 1100 BCE	Jin is established in China.
c. 1077 BCE	The New Kingdom of Egypt collapses, beginning the Third Intermediate Period of Egypt
c. 1070 BCE	Pharaoh Nesbanebdjed I establishes the Twenty-first Dynasty of Egypt. Tanis becomes the capital.
c. 1047 BCE	Shaul ben Qysh establishes the United Kingdom of Israel and Judah. Gibeah is the capital.
c. 1046 BCE	Shangfu establishes Qi in China. Yingqiu is the capital.
c. 1046 BCE	Wu establishes Western Zhou dynasty in China. Fenghao is the capital.
c. 1043 BCE	Bo Qin establishes Lu in China. Qufu is the capital.
c. 1004 BCE	King David conquers the city of Jebus and makes the renamed City of David (now Jerusalem) the capital of the United Kingdom of Israel and Judah.

=== First Millennium BCE ===
Year	Date	Event
c. 945 BCE		Pharaoh Shoshenq I establishes the Twenty-second Dynasty of Egypt.
c. 930 BCE		The Kingdom of Israel under Jeroboam I separates from the Kingdom of Judah under Rehoboam. Samaria becomes the capital of Israel, while Jerusalem remains the capital of Judah.
911 BCE		Adad-nirari II establishes the New Assyrian Empire.
c. 910 BCE		Feizi establishes Qin in China.
c. 910 BCE		Earliest city-states in Ancient Greece.
879 BCE		Ashurnasirpal II moves the capital of the New Assyrian Empire to Kalhu.
c. 875 BCE		Pharaoh Pedubast I establishes the Twenty-third Dynasty of Egypt. Thebes is the capital of Upper Egypt.
808 BCE		Karanus establishes the Argead Dynasty of Macedon and builds Aigai to be the capital.
770 BCE		Ping establishes the Eastern Zhou dynasty in China. Wangcheng is the capital.
753 BCE	21 April	Romulus establishes the Kingdom of Rome. The new city of Rome becomes the capital.
745 BCE		Tiglath-Pileser III founds the Neo-Assyrian Empire, annexing the city of Babylon
c. 740 BCE		Nubian King Piye establishes the Twenty-fifth Dynasty of Egypt and rules Egypt from Napata in Nubia.
734–733 BCE		The city of Syracuse, Sicily is founded by settlers from Corinth and Tenea.
732 BCE		The Assyrians conquer Damascus, ending the kingdom of Aram-Damascus.
c. 728 BCE		Pharaoh Tefnakhte establishes the Twenty-fourth Dynasty of Egypt. Sais becomes the capital.
720 BCE		Traditional date for the destruction of the Kingdom of Israel at the hands of the Assyrians.
717 BCE		The Neo-Hittite state of Carchemish falls to the Assyrians.
713 BCE		The Neo-Hittite states of Tabal and Hilakku fall to the Assyrians.
706 BCE		The capital of Assyria moves from Nimrud to Dur-Sharrukin.
705 BCE		The capital of Assyria moves from Dur-Sharrukin to Nineveh.
c. 700 BCE		Phoenicians establish a colony in Malta with Maleth as capital.
695 BCE		Gordium, capital of Phrygia, is destroyed by the Cimmerians, resulting in Phrygia being ruled by the Lydians.
694 BCE		Deioces is elected the first King of the Medes. Ecbatana (now Hamadan) is the capital.
671 BCE		Esarhaddon captures Memphis and drives the Kushites out of Lower Egypt, and establishes local rulers in the delta region.
c. 664 BCE		Pharaoh Necho I establishes the Twenty-sixth Dynasty of Egypt. Sais is the capital.
660 BCE	11 February	Emperor Jimmu establishes the Empire of Japan.
657 BCE		Byzantium is settled by colonists from Megara.
653 BCE		After the Battle of Ulai, Elam is vassalized by the Assyrians.
650 BCE		Ancient Carthage is established.
640 BCE		The Assyrians conquer Elam.
626 BCE	November	The Neo-Babylonian Empire is established.
620 BCE		Uruk and Nippur are conquered by the Neo-Babylonian Empire.
615 BCE	October or November	The Medes conquer Arrapḫa from the Neo-Assyrian Empire.
612 BCE		Nineveh falls to a coalition of the Medes and Babylonians
609 BCE		Harran, the new capital of the Neo-Assyrian Empire, is destroyed by the Medes and Babylonians
605 BCE		With the Battle of Carchemish, the Neo-Assyrian Empire is destroyed and replaced by a balance of power between Babylon, Media, Lydia and Egypt.
586 BCE		Traditional date for the destruction of the Kingdom of Judah at the hands of the Babylonians.
550 BCE		Cyrus the Great establishes the Achaemenid Empire and makes Pasargadae the new capital.
546 BCE		Cyrus the Great conquers the Lydian Empire
543 BCE		Prince Vijaya establishes the Sinhala Kingdom at Tambapanni and makes Tambapaṇṇī the new capital, in Sri Lanka.
539 BCE		Cyrus the Great conquers the Neo-Babylonian Empire.
535 BCE		Cyrus the Great conquers the Gandhara Kingdom.
535 BCE		Cyrus the Great conquers Phoenicia.
525 BCE	May	Cambyses II of Persia conquers Egypt and establishes the Persian Twenty-seventh Dynasty of Egypt as Pharaoh Cambyses II.
515 BCE		Darius the Great moves the capital of the Achaemenid Empire to Persepolis.
509 BCE		The Roman Republic supersedes the Kingdom of Rome.
492 BCE		The Kingdom of Macedonia is conquered by the Achaemenid Empire.
479 BCE		The Delian League is established.
479 BCE		The Kingdom of Macedonia becomes independent of the Achaemenid Empire.
409 BCE		Selinus and Himera in Sicily are destroyed by Carthage.
406 BCE		Akragas in Sicily is abandoned by the Greeks and sacked by Carthage.
405 BCE		Gela and Camarina in Sicily are abandoned by the Greeks and sacked by Carthage.
404 BCE		Amyrtaeus expels the Persians from Egypt and establishes the Twenty-eighth Dynasty of Egypt as Pharaoh Amyrtaeus. Sais is the capital.
404 BCE		Athens surrenders to Sparta and her allies, resulting in the dismemberment of the Delian League and a temporary Spartan hegemony.
403 BCE		Zhao arises from the division of Jin.
403 BCE		Han arises from the division of Jin.
403 BCE		Wei arises from the division of Jin.
399 BCE	Autumn	Pharaoh Nefaarud I establishes the Twenty-ninth Dynasty of Egypt. Mendes becomes the capital.
387 BCE		The Peace of Antalcidas imposes Persian rule on the Greek cities of Asia and Cyprus.
380 BCE	November	Pharaoh Nectanebo I establishes the Thirtieth Dynasty of Egypt. Sebennytos becomes the capital.
377 BCE		The Anuradhapura Kingdom is established.
376 BCE		Fall of Jin in China.
375 BCE		Zheng annexed by Han.
343 BCE		Artaxerxes III of Persia reconquers Egypt and establishes the Persian Thirty-first Dynasty of Egypt as Pharaoh Artaxerxes III.
338 BCE		Philip II of Macedon unites Greece.
332 BCE		Alexander the Great of Macedon conquers Persian-occupied Egypt and establishes the Argead Dynasty of Egypt as Pharaoh Alexander III. Alexander builds a new capital at Alexandria.
331 BCE		The Kingdom of Armenia is established. Dvin is the capital.
330 BCE		Alexander the Great conquers the Achaemenid Empire and makes Babylon the capital.
329 BCE		Alexander conquers Samarkand.
323 BCE		Alexander the Great of Macedon dies and his empire splits.
322 BCE		Chandragupta establishes the Maurya Empire of ancient India. Pataliputra (now Patna) is the capital.
316 BCE		The states of Shu and Ba are conquered by King Huiwen of Qin.
312 BCE		Macedonian general Seleucus establishes the Seleucid Empire. Babylon is the capital.
309 BCE		Seleucus I Nicator forms the Seleucid Empire after conquering Babylonia, Media, and Elam from Antigonus I Monophthalmus in the Babylonian War, leaving him with one-third of his empire.
306 BCE		Following the death of Alexander IV of Macedon, Antigonus I Monophthalmus declares himself an independent king, soon to by followed by his fellow Diadochi Ptolemy I Soter, Seleucus I Nicator, Lysimachus, and Cassander.
305 BCE		Macedonian general Ptolemy establishes the Ptolemaic Dynasty of Egypt as King Ptolemy I Soter.
302 BCE		Parnavaz I founds the Kingdom of Iberia in the Caucasus.
301 BCE		The death of Antigonus I Monophthalmus at the Battle of Ipsus results in his kingdom being divided between the remaining Diadochi, namely Ptolemy I Soter, Seleucus I Nicator, Lysimachus, and Cassander.
c. 300 BCE		The Chola dynasty is established.
294 BCE		Demetrius I of Macedon kills Alexander V of Macedon, and in claiming the throne loses Thebes to a revolt.
291 BCE		Demetrius Poliorcetes captures Thebes after a successful siege.
281 BCE		Lysimachus dies at the Battle of Corupedium, his empire falling to the Seleucids.
266 BCE		Ashoka unifies most of South Asia.
238 BCE		Arsaces I of Parthia establishes the Arsacid Dynasty of Parthia. Hecatompylus becomes the capital.
238 BCE		Sardinia and Corsica become Roman provinces.
238 BCE		Sicily becomes the first Roman province.
230 BCE		Han is conquered by Qin.
225 BCE		Wei is conquered by Qin.
222 BCE		Zhao is conquered by Qin.
222 BCE		Yan is conquered by Qin.
221 BCE		Qin Shi Huang unifies ancient China and establishes the Qin dynasty in China. Xianyang is the capital.
221 BCE		Qi is conquered by Qin.
211 BCE		The Romans capture Syracuse.
209 BCE		The Romans conquer Cartagena from the Carthaginians, bringing Carthaginian Spain under Roman control.
206 BCE		Fall of the Qin dynasty in China.
204 BCE		Zhao Tuo establishes Nanyue in what is now Southern China. Panyu is the capital.
202 BCE	28 February	Gaozu establishes the Western Han dynasty in China. Chang'an is the capital.
202 BCE		The Kingdom of Numidia is established. Cirta is the capital.
c. 200 BCE		The Nabataean Empire is established. Petra is the capital.
194 BCE		Wanggeom-seong becomes the capital of Wiman Joseon on the Korean Peninsula.
194 BCE		The Seleucids take control of Coele Syria and Judea from Ptolemaic Egypt.
194 BCE		The Romans force Philip of Macedon to abandon Greece in the Peace of Flamininus, while allowing him to maintain Macedon itself.
185 BCE		The Shunga Empire is formed after the Mauryan Empire is destroyed.
180 BCE		Demetrius I of Bactria invades India, forming the Indo-Greek Kingdom.
168 BCE		The Romans dissolve the Kingdom of Macedon after the Battle of Pydna.
150 BCE		The Kingdom of Aksum is established.
148 BCE		Mithridates I of Parthia conquers Ecbatana.
146 BCE		The Romans conquer Iberia.
146 BCE		Ancient Carthage is disestablished.
146 BCE		The Romans conquer Corinth and dissolve the Achaean League.
146 BCE		The Roman provinces of Macedon and Achaea are formed.
135 BCE		The western half of Minyue is conquered by the Han dynasty.
133 BCE		Upon the death of Attalus III, he wills his kingdom of Pergamon to the Roman Republic.
133 BCE		The Romans conquer Celtiberia following the Siege of Numantia.
111 BCE		By this date, the Han dynasty under Wu had conquered much of what is today Southern China and Northern Vietnam from Nanyue. Start of the First Chinese domination of Vietnam.
75 BCE		The Kanva dynasty is established.
63 BCE		The Romans conquer Jerusalem.
63 BCE		The Romans annex western Pontus and create a client state out of the Eastern portion under Pharnaces II.
58–50 BCE		The Romans conquer Gaul.
57 BCE		Hyeokgeose establishes Silla on the southeast Korean Peninsula. Gyeongju is the capital.
37 BCE		Dongmyeong establishes Goguryeo on the northern Korean Peninsula. Jolbon is the capital.
37 BCE		Romans annex the Kingdom of Numidia.
35 BCE		The Romans conquer the city of Sirmium (present-day Sremska Mitrovica).
30 BCE	1 August	Roman consul Gaius Julius Caesar Octavianus conquers the Ptolemaic Kingdom of Egypt. Octavianus organizes Egypt as a province under his personal control.
27 BCE	16 January	The Roman Senate grants Gaius Julius Caesar Octavianus the title Augustus. This effectively ends the Roman Republic and establishes the Roman Empire.
18 BCE		Onjo establishes Baekje on the central Korean Peninsula. Wiryeseong is the capital.

== Common Era (CE) ==
=== First Millennium CE ===
==== 1st century ====
Year	Date	Event
3		The Goguryeo of Korea moves its capital from Jolbon to Gungnae.
5		The Romans conquer much of the Middle East.
9		Wang Mang establishes the Xin dynasty in China.
12		The Romans conquer the Artaxiad dynasty.
19		The Indo-Parthian Kingdom splits off from the Parthian Empire. Taxila is the capital.
25		Guangwu establishes the Eastern Han dynasty in China.
30		Kujula Kadphises establishes the Kushan Empire.
40		The Trưng Sisters rebel against Chinese rule in Vietnam, ending the First Chinese domination of Vietnam.
42		The Gaya confederacy is established in the south of the Korean peninsula.
43		Beginning of the Second Chinese domination of Vietnam.
43		The Romans begin their conquest of Great Britain.
44		The Romans conquer Mauretania.
71–84		The Romans conquer Wales and southern Scotland.
83		The Romans establish the provinces of Germania Inferior and Germania Superior.
93		Xianbei emerges as a tribal federation of nomadic tribes.

==== 2nd century ====
Year	Date	Event
106		The Roman province of Roman Dacia is established.
106		The Romans conquer the Nabataean Empire and establish the province of Arabia Petraea.
114–116		A war with the Parthian Empire leads to parts of Mesopotamia being annexed to the Roman Empire.
136		After the Bar Kokhba revolt, the Romans dissolve the province of Judea and incorporate it into Syria Palaestina.
c. 180		Buyeo is established in Northeast Asia.
192		The first kingdom of the Champa is established.

==== 3rd century ====
Year	Date	Event
220		Wen establishes Cao Wei in China. Xuchang and Luoyang are the capitals.
221		Zhaolie establishes Shu Han in China. Chengdu is the capital.
222		Da establishes Eastern Wu in China. Wuchang and Jianye are the capitals.
224		The Indo-Parthian Kingdom is dissolved.
224		The Sasanian Empire is established in Persia and follows the Parthian Empire.
234		Xianbei is dissolved.
240		The Gupta Empire is established in India.
260		Syrian Queen Zenobia breaks from the Roman Empire and establishes the Palmyrene Empire. Palmyra is the capital.
260		Postumus (Marcus Cassianius Latinius Postumus) breaks from the Roman Empire and establishes the Gallic Empire. Colonia Agrippina (now Cologne, Germany) is the capital.
266		Wu establishes the Western Jin dynasty in China. Luoyang and Chang'an are the capitals.
269		The Palmyrene Empire conquers the Roman Province of Egypt.
269		Roman Emperor Claudius II recovers Hispania from the Gallic Empire.
271		Roman Dacia is abandoned.
273		Roman Emperor Aurelian (Lucius Domitius Aurelianus) conquers the Gallic Empire, which is subsumed back into the Roman Empire.
274		Roman Emperor Aurelian conquers the Palmyrene Empire, which is subsumed back into the Roman Empire.
286	1 April	Roman Emperor Diocletian (Gaius Aurelius Valerius Diocletianus) appoints Maximian (Marcus Aurelius Valerius Maximianus Herculius) as his co-emperor, splitting the Roman Empire into a dyarchy with capitals at Mediolanum (now Milan, Italy) and Augusta Treverorum (now Trier, Germany).
293		Roman co-emperors Diocletian and Maximian split the Roman Empire into a tetrarchy with capitals at Mediolanum (now Milan, Italy), Augusta Treverorum (now Trier, Germany), Nicomedia (now İzmit, Turkey), and Sirmium (now Sremska Mitrovica, Serbia).

==== 4th century ====
Year	Date	Event
301	3 September	Saint Marinus establishes the Most Serene Republic of San Marino, declaring independence from the Roman Empire. The City of San Marino is the capital.
304		Guangwen establishes Han Zhao in China.
304		Wu establishes Cheng Han in China. Chengdu is the capital.
317		Yuan establishes the Eastern Jin dynasty in China. Jiankang is the capital.
319		Ming establishes Later Zhao in China.
320		Ming establishes Former Liang in China.
324	18 September	Constantine the Great reunites the Roman Empire. Nicomedia (now İzmit, Turkey) becomes the capital.
330	11 May	Roman Emperor Constantine the Great builds a new capital for the Roman Empire at Byzantium which he renames Constantinopolis (now Istanbul, Turkey).
337		Wenming establishes Former Yan in China.
351		Jingming establishes Former Qin in China.
358		Franks are allowed to settle in Toxandria (present-day Belgium).
370		The Bosporan Kingdom is disestablished.
370		Huns appear north of the Black Sea.
375		Fall of the Kushan Empire in India.
384		Chengwu establishes Later Yan in China.
384		Wuzhao establishes Later Qin in China. Chang'an is the capital.
384		Liewen establishes Western Yan in China.
385		Xuanlie establishes Western Qin in China.
386		Yiwu establishes Later Liang in China. Guzang is the capital.
386		Daowu establishes the Northern Wei dynasty in China.
395	17 January	At his death, Roman emperor Theodosius I permanently splits the Roman Empire between his two sons: Arcadius rules the Eastern Roman Empire from Constantinopolis (now Istanbul, Turkey), and Honorius rules the Western Roman Empire from Mediolanum (now Milan, Italy).
397		Wu establishes Southern Liang in China.
397		Duan Ye establishes Northern Liang in China.
398		Xianwu establishes Southern Yan in China.

==== 5th century ====
Year	Date	Event
400		Wuzhao establishes Western Liang in China.
402		The capital of the Western Roman Empire is moved to Ravenna.
405		A mixed group of barbarians including Vandals, Alans, and Suebi enter the Western Roman Empire in the Crossing of the Rhine.
407		Qujie establishes Xia in China.
407		Ziyu establishes Northern Yan in China.
411		The Burgundians establish a kingdom on the western bank of the Rhine.
418		The Visigoths establish a kingdom in southern Gaul.
420		Wu establishes the Liu Song dynasty in China. Jiankang is the capital.
426		The Alans leave Hispania.
427		The Goguryeo of Korea moves its capital from Gungnae City to Pyongyang.
428		The Kingdom of Armenia is annexed by the Sasanian Empire.
429		The Vandals enter Africa.
430		The Vandals conquer Corsica from the Western Roman Empire.
435		The Vandals establish the Vandal Kingdom in North Africa.
439		The Vandals take Carthage.
c. 440		Attila the Hun establishes the Hunnic Empire north of the Danube.
451–453		The Huns attack the Western Roman Empire.
c. 455		The Kingdom of Kent is founded. Canterbury is the capital.
457–461		Western Roman Emperor Majorian makes a concerted effort to try to restore the Empire, and reconquers most of Hispania and southern Gaul.
469		The Hunnic Empire is disestablished after Dengizich dies.
475		The Baekje of Korea moves its capital from Wirye to Ungjin by pressure from Goguryeo.
476	4 September	The Germanic leader Odoacer forces Roman Emperor Romulus Augustus to abdicate, bringing the Western Roman Empire to an end.
479		Gao establishes the Southern Qi dynasty in China. Jiankang is the capital.
c. 477		The Kingdom of Sussex is established. Chichester is the capital.
480		A Roman rump state, Roman Dalmatia, is disestablished after Julius Nepos is murdered.
481		The Frankish Empire is established by Clovis I and includes large areas of the former Western Roman Empire. Tournai is the capital.
486		The Kingdom of Soissons, a Roman rump state ruled by Syagrius, is conquered by the Franks.
490		Odoacer is defeated at the river Adda by the Goths and flees.
493		The Ostrogoths establish the Ostrogothic Kingdom in Italy.
494		Buyeo is conquered by Goguryeo.

==== 6th century ====
Year	Date	Event
c. 500		The Ghana Empire is established.
502		Wu establishes the Liang dynasty in China.
508		Frankish King Clovis the Frank makes Paris the capital of the Frankish Kingdom.
519		The Kingdom of Wessex is established. Winchester is the capital.
522		The Byzantine Empire conquers Corsica from the Vandals.
527		Mercia is established in Anglo-Saxon England. Tamworth is the capital.
534		Wen establishes the Western Wei dynasty in China.
534		Xiaojing establishes the Eastern Wei dynasty in China.
538		The Baekje of Korea moves its capital from Ungjin to Sabi.
538		The Vandal Kingdom is conquered by the Byzantine Empire.
543		Fall of the Gupta Empire in India.
544		Lý Nam Đế establishes the Early Lý dynasty in Vietnam, ending the Second Chinese domination of Vietnam.
550		Wenxuan establishes the Northern Qi dynasty in China.
552		The First Turkic Khaganate is established.
553		The Ostrogothic Kingdom is conquered by the Byzantine Empire.
555		Xuan establishes the Western Liang dynasty in China.
555		Garibald I becomes the first documented duke of the Duchy of Bavaria.
557		Xiaomin establishes the Northern Zhou dynasty in China.
557		Wu establishes the Chen dynasty in China.
568		The Kingdom of the Lombards is established. Pavia is the capital.
570		The Duchy of Spoleto is established. Spoleto is the capital.
571		The Duchy of Benevento is established.
580		The Sasanian Empire annexes the Kingdom of Iberia.
581		Wen establishes the Sui dynasty in China. Chang'an is the capital.
585		The Visigothic Kingdom conquers the Kingdom of the Suebi.

==== 7th century ====
Year	Date	Event
c. 600		The Duchy of Croatia is established.
c. 600		The Frisian Kingdom is established. Dorestad is the capital.
602		The Early Lý dynasty of Vietnam is conquered by the Sui dynasty of China, beginning the Third Chinese domination of Vietnam.
602		The Duchy of Aquitaine is established.
602		The Duchy of Gascony is established.
605		The Sui dynasty in China moves its capital from Chang'an to Luoyang.
610		The Eastern Roman Empire transforms into the Greek-oriented Byzantine Empire.
618	18 June	Gaozu establishes the Tang dynasty in China. Chang'an and Luoyang are the capitals.
618		Songtsen Gampo establishes the Tibetan Empire. Lhasa is the capital.
628		Hwicce becomes a client or sub-kingdom of Mercia.
630	11 January	The Islamic prophet Muhammad (Muhammad ibn ‘Abdullāh) conquers Mecca and unites Arabia. Medina is the capital.
632		Abu Bakr establishes the Rashidun Caliphate, the first great Muslim empire. Medina is the capital.
634		The Anglian kingdoms of Bernicia and Deira unite to form Northumbria.
640		The Rashidun Caliphate conquers Egypt from the Byzantine Empire.
643		The Rashidun Caliphate conquers Tripolitania from the Byzantine Empire.
651		The Sasanian Empire collapses after the conquest of Persia by the Rashidun Caliphate.
650		The Srivijaya Empire is established.
654		Arminiya is established. Dvin is the capital.
656		The Rashidun Caliphate moves its capital from Medina to Kufa.
661		Muawiyah I establishes the Umayyad Caliphate, which follows the Rashidun Caliphate. Damascus is the capital.
661		The Duchy of Naples is established as a province of the Byzantine Empire and soon becomes a de facto independent state. Naples is the capital.
676		Silla unifies the Three Kingdoms of Korea. Gyeongju is the capital.
680		The Kingdom of Ceredigion changes its name to the Kingdom of Seisyllwg.
681		Khan Asparukh crosses the Danube Delta and settles in the Ongal area (Southern Bessarabia or northern Dobruja). Asparukh, with his Slav allies, defeats Byzantine Emperor Constantine IV and establishes the First Bulgarian Empire. Pliska is the capital.
682		The Second Turkic Khaganate becomes independent of the Tang dynasty.
690		King Go establishes Balhae in Manchuria and the northern Korean Peninsula.
690		Wu Zhao establishes Wu Zhou in China. Shendu is the capital.
690		Muslims conquer North Africa.
697		The Republic of Venice is established. Eraclea is the capital.

==== 8th century ====
Year	Date	Event
705		The Tang dynasty in China is restored under Zhongzong.
710		The Nara period begins in Japan.
711		A Berber force under the Berber general Tariq ibn Ziyad, loyal to the Emir of Damascus, enters the Iberian peninsula from North Africa, thus starting the foundation of Al-Andalus.
717		Córdoba becomes the capital of Muslim Al-Andalus.
718		The Kingdom of Asturias is established.
718		The second Arab siege of Constantinople ends with the destruction of a large part of the Umayyad Caliphate's fleet. This prevents the complete conquest of the Byzantine Empire by the Muslims.
722		The Kingdom of Asturias defeats the Muslim Al-Andalus in the Battle of Covadonga. This marks the beginning of the Reconquista, which lasted for over 700 years.
725		The Lombards conquer Corsica from the Byzantine Empire.
732	10 October	By winning the Battle of Tours, the Franks defeat the Umayyad invasion of Gaul and halt further Muslim expansion into Christian Europe.
734		The Franks annex the Frisian lands between the Vlie and the Lauwers.
742		The Republic of Venice moves its capital from Eraclea to Malamocco.
744		The Uyghur Khaganate follows the Second Turkic Khaganate.
744		The Franks conquer Alemannia.
750		The Abbasid Caliphate follows the Umayyad Caliphate. Kufa is the capital.
750		Gopala I establishes the Pala Dynasty in India.
751		The Exarchate of Ravenna, the center of Byzantine power in Italy, is disestablished after the Lombards invade.
751		The Abbasid Caliphate defeats the Tang dynasty in the Battle of Talas, thus conquering Transoxania and spreading Islam in Central Asia.
751		The Imamate of Oman is established.
754		The Papal States are established. Rome is the capital.
756		Abd al-Rahman I establishes the Emirate of Córdoba as an Umayyad exile empire on the Iberian Peninsula. Córdoba is the capital.
759		The Franks conquer Septimania.
761		The Rustamid dynasty is established in North Africa.
762		Baghdad becomes the capital of the Abbasid Caliphate for the first time.
768–769		The Franks conquer Aquitania.
769		The Franks conquer Gascony.
774		The Franks conquer the Kingdom of the Lombards (Italy).
774		The Lombard Duchy of Benevento in the south of Italy effectively becomes independent and becomes the Principality of Benevento.
785		The Franks defeat Widukind, thereby conquering the remaining Frisian lands east of the Lauwers and vassalizing Saxony.
787		The Duchy of Benevento submits to Frankish overlordship but retains effective autonomy.
788		The Franks conquer Bavaria.
788		The Franks annex Chieti from the Principality of Benevento to the Duchy of Spoleto.
794		Kyoto becomes the capital of Japan.
795		The Franks create the Marca Hispanica as a buffer against Muslim Al-Andalus.
796		The capital of the Abbasid Caliphate is moved to Raqqa.

==== 9th century ====
Year	Date	Event
800		Charlemagne establishes the Carolingian Empire. While Rome is the official capital of the empire, Aix-la-Chapelle is the de facto capital.
800		Saxony is integrated into the Frankish Kingdom as the Duchy of Saxony.
801		The County of Barcelona is established. Barcelona is the capital.
802		Jayavarman II establishes the Khmer Empire.
807		The County of Aragon is established.
810		The Republic of Venice moves its capital from Malamocco to Venice.
814		Cornwall loses its independence to Wessex, possibly becoming a sub-kingdom.
820		The title Count of Aragon is usurped and Aragon ceases to be a vassal of the Franks.
821		The Tahirid dynasty is established in Persia. Merv is the capital.
824		The Kingdom of Pamplona (later Navarre) is established.
825		The Kingdom of Essex is ceded to Wessex.
825		The Kingdom of Sussex becomes subject to Wessex.
828		Carantania is absorbed into Bavaria
831	September	Palermo, Sicily is captured by the Aghlabid Emirate of Ifriqiya, is renamed al-Madinah, and becomes the capital of Muslim Sicily.
833		Great Moravia is established.
836		The capital of the Abbasid Caliphate is moved to Samarra.
840		The Uyghur Khaganate is destroyed by the Kyrgyz.
842		The Tibetan Empire disintegrates into various small states.
843		Charles the Bald, grandson of Emperor Charlemagne, makes Paris the capital of the Kingdom of the West Franks, established as the result of the Treaty of Verdun.
843		The Kingdom of Scotland (Kingdom of Alba) is unified.
843		The Carolingian Empire (Francia) is partitioned into three by the Treaty of Verdun, forming West, Middle, and East Francia.
846		The March of Tuscany is established. Lucca is the capital.
850		The Chimú Empire is established in South America.
851		The Principality of Salerno is partitioned from the Principality of Benevento.
851		The Kingdom of Brittany is established.
853		The Vikings establish the Kingdom of Dublin.
855		Middle Francia is partitioned into the Kingdom of Italy, Lotharingia, and the Kingdom of Provence by the Treaty of Prüm.
858		Æthelberht is crowned king of Sussex and Kent.
860		Æthelberht succeeds his brother Æthelbald as king of Wessex, thus uniting it with Sussex and Kent.
861		The Saffarid dynasty is established in Persia. Zaranj is the capital.
862		The County of Flanders is established. Bruges is the capital.
865		Danish Vikings conquer parts of England and found Daneslaw.
867		The Danes conquer Northumbria.
868		The Turkic Tulunids under Ahmad ibn Tulun split off from the Abbasids and rule over Egypt.
868		The County of Portugal is established. Braga is the capital.
869		The Danes conquer East Anglia.
c. 870		The Principality of Bohemia is established. Prague is the capital.
870		As a result of the Treaty of Meerssen, Lotharingia is divided between East and West Francia, and Provence is divided between East Francia, West Francia, and the Kingdom of Italy.
872		The Kingdom of Norway is unified.
873		The Byzantine Empire re-conquers Otranto from the Saracens.
873		The Tahirid Dynasty is conquered in Persia by the Saffarid Dynasty.
876		The Byzantine Empire re-conquers Bari.
878		The Emirate of Sicily takes Syracuse, Sicily from the Byzantine Empire.
879		The Kievan Rus' is established by Vikings. Novgorod is the capital.
880s		Byzantine control in southern Italy is extended over most of Apulia and Calabria.
880		The Kings of West Francia cede their portion of Lotharingia to East Francia by the Treaty of Ribemont.
884		Arminiya is dissolved.
891		The Byzantine Empire conquers Benevento and establishes the theme of Longobardia.
891		Harald Fairhair unifies the Petty kingdoms of Norway and establishes the Kingdom of Norway. Stavanger becomes the capital.
893		The First Bulgarian Empire moves its capital from Pliska to Preslav.
895		Grand Prince Árpád establishes the Principality of Hungary.
895		Pannonia is reunited
896		The Sultanate of Showa is established.
898		The Electorate of Trier is established.

==== 10th century ====
Year	Date	Event
902		The Byzantine city of Taormina, Sicily falls to the Emirate of Ifriqiya.
903		Gaozu establishes Former Shu in China. Chengdu is the capital.
905		The Khúc clan establishes de facto rule over Vietnam.
906		The Duchy of Franconia is established.
907		Taizu establishes Min in China. Changle is the capital.
907		The Fatimids take Raqqada from the Aghlabid Emirate of Ifriqiya, establishing the Fatimid Caliphate.
907		Taizu establishes the Later Liang dynasty in China. Luoyang and Kaifeng are the capitals.
907		Liezu establishes Yang Wu in China.
907		Wumu establishes Ma Chu in China.
907		Taizu establishes Wuyue in China.
907		Collapse of the Tang dynasty in China.
909		Fall of the Rustamid dynasty in North Africa.
909		The Abbasid Caliphate reconquers Egypt from the Tulunids.
910	10 December	The Kingdom of Asturias moves its capital to León and becomes the Kingdom of León.
911		The Duchy of Normandy is founded by the Vikings. Rouen is the capital.
916		Taizu establishes the Liao dynasty in China.
916–917		Mercia and Wessex reconquer the Five Boroughs of the Danelaw from the Danes.
917		Gaozu establishes Southern Han in China. Xingwang is the capital.
918		King Taejo establishes Goryeo Dynasty on the Korean Peninsula. Gaegyeong is the official capital.
918		The Duchy of Burgundy is established.
918		The Kingdom of East Anglia is conquered by Wessex.
918		The Kingdom of Mercia is absorbed into Wessex.
920		The Kingdom of Seisyllwg unites with the Kingdom of Dyfed to form the Kingdom of Deheubarth.
920		The County of Horne is established in the Holy Roman Empire.
922		The County of Aragon falls under the control of the Kingdom of Pamplona.
923		Zhuangzong establishes the Later Tang dynasty in China. Luoyang is the capital.
924		Wuxin establishes Jingnan in China. Jingzhou is the capital.
925		Tomislav establishes the Kingdom of Croatia out of the Duchy of Croatia.
927	12 July	King Athelstan of Wessex conquers the Kingdom of Northumbria, thus uniting all of the Anglo-Saxon kingdoms under one ruler and establishing what would come to be known as the Kingdom of England. Winchester is the capital.
929		The Caliphate of Córdoba follows the Emirate of Córdoba.
c. 930		Fall of the Aksumite Empire and beginning of the Zagwe dynasty in Ethiopia.
933		The Kingdom of Burgundy is established.
934		The Ikhshidid dynasty is established in Egypt. They rule as vassals of the Abbasid Caliphate. Fustat is the capital.
934		Gaozu establishes Later Shu in China. Chengdu is the capital.
934		The Buyid dynasty is established in Persia. Shiraz is the capital.
936		Gaozu establishes the Later Jin dynasty in China.
936		The Goryeo Dynasty unifies the Later Three Kingdoms of Korea.
937		Liezu establishes Southern Tang in China. Jinling is the capital.
937		Taizu establishes Dali in what is now Southwest China.
938		Vietnam declares independence from the Southern Han of China, ending the Third Chinese domination of Vietnam.
939		Ngô Quyền establishes the Ngô dynasty in Vietnam. Cổ Loa is the capital.
939		The Duchy of Brittany follows the Kingdom of Brittany.
941		Jórvík reoccupies the Five Boroughs of the Danelaw for the Danes.
942		England re-takes the Five Boroughs of the Danelaw.
947		Gaozu establishes the Later Han dynasty in China. Bianzhou is the capital.
948		The first Emirs of Sicily, the Kalbids, are appointed, establishing the Emirate of Sicily.
951		Taizu establishes the Later Zhou dynasty in China. Kaifeng is the capital.
951		Shizu establishes Northern Han in China. Taiyuan is the capital.
953		The Electorate of Cologne is established. Cologne is the capital.
954		The Viking Kingdom of Jórvík (the Viking-ruled portion of the former Kingdom of Northumbria) is conquered by England, thus ending the Danelaw.
958		The Republic of Genoa is established. Genoa is the capital.
959		Lower Lorraine is established.
c. 960		Mieszko I establishes the Duchy of Poland.
960	3 January	Taizu establishes the Northern Song dynasty in China. Kaifeng is the capital.
961		King Otto I of Germany invades the Kingdom of Italy (of which his wife Adelaide of Italy was already queen) and is crowned King.
961		The Kingdom of Nri is established in West Africa.
962	2 February	King Otto I of Germany and Italy has himself crowned Holy Roman Emperor by the Pope, thereby forming the Holy Roman Empire. Rome is the official capital.
c. 965		The Byzantine Empire establishes the theme of Lucania.
c. 965		The Byzantine Empire establishes the Catepanate of Italy.
c. 965		The Kalbids take the last remaining Byzantine territory in Sicily.
965		The Ngô dynasty of Vietnam collapses.
968		Đinh Bộ Lĩnh establishes the Đinh dynasty in Vietnam. Hoa Lư is the capital.
969		The Fatimids conquer Egypt from the Ikhshidids and establish the city of Cairo.
971		The First Bulgarian Empire moves its capital from Preslav to Ohrid.
974		The Heian period begins in Japan. Kyoto is the capital.
975		Erik Segersäll becomes the first king of Sweden.
976		The Duchy of Carinthia is established.
977		The Ghaznavid dynasty is established in Persia. Ghazni is the capital.
980		Lê Hoàn establishes the Early Lê dynasty in Vietnam. Hoa Lư is the capital.
981		The County of Namur is established in the Holy Roman Empire.
985		The Prince-Bishopric of Liège is established in the Holy Roman Empire.
987		Hughe Capet confirms Paris as the capital of the Kingdom of the West Franks (soon to become the Kingdom of France).

=== Second Millennium CE ===
==== 11th century ====
Year	Date	Event
c. 1000		The Republic of Pisa is established. Pisa is the capital.
1000		King Stephen I establishes the Kingdom of Hungary. Esztergom and Székesfehérvár are royal seats.
1003		Leif Ericson discovers Newfoundland, off the Atlantic coast of North America, and establishes a short-lived colony at L'Anse aux Meadows.
1003		Fall of the Saffarid dynasty in Persia.
1003		The County of Savoy is established in the Holy Roman Empire.
1005		The Republic of Genoa is established. Genoa is the capital.
1008		The Kingdom of Georgia is established from the union of all of the Christian states of Georgia. Kutaisi is the capital.
1009		Thái Tổ establishes the Lý dynasty in Vietnam.
1012		The County of Zeeland is established in the Holy Roman Empire. Middelburg is the capital.
1016		The North Sea Empire, under King Cnut the Great, which included England, Denmark, Norway, and parts of Northern Germany, Scotland, and Sweden, is created by a personal union. Ribe is the capital.
1018		Northumbrian territory north of the River Tweed is ceded to Scotland.
1018		The First Bulgarian Empire ends with the annexation of the last territories by the Byzantine Empire.
1018–1054		At some point between 1018 and 1054, the Kingdom of Strathclyde is conquered by Scotland.
1024		The Prince-Bishopric of Utrecht is established in the Holy Roman Empire.
1025		Under Rajendra I, the Chola dynasty subjugates large parts of Southeast Asia.
1025		Bolesław I establishes the Kingdom of Poland.
1030		Kievan Rus' conquers Ugandi County in southeastern Estonia.
1032		The Kingdom of Burgundy is inherited by Conrad II, Holy Roman Emperor, and incorporated into the Holy Roman Empire.
1035		The territory that would come to be the Kingdom of Aragon is united under Ramiro I of Aragon.
1037		Sultan Tughril establishes the Seljuk Empire as one of the early Turkish empires. Nishapur is the capital.
1038		Jingzong establishes the Western Xia dynasty in China. Xingqing is the capital.
1040		The Almoravid dynasty is founded in what is now Morocco. Aghmat is the capital.
1042		The Norman County of Apulia and Calabria is established.
1042		End of the North Sea Empire.
1043		The Kingdom of Aragon becomes de facto independent from the Kingdom of Pamplona.
1043		The Seljuk Empire moves its capital from Nishapur to Rey.
1055		Vijayabahu I moves the capital of the Sinhala Kingdom to Polonnaruwa, establishing the Kingdom of Polonnaruwa, in Sri Lanka.
1058		The Duchy of Schleswig is founded.
1059	23 August	The County of Apulia and Calabria is raised to a duchy when Pope Nicholas II signs the Treaty of Melfi with the Norman princes Robert Guiscard and Richard I of Capua.
1061		Estonians reconquer Ugandi County from the Kievan Rus'.
1061		Messina, Sicily, is captured from the Muslims by the Normans.
1061		End of the Pala dynasty in India.
1062		The Buyid dynasty is dissolved.
1062		The Almoravid dynasty moves its capital from Aghmat to Marrakesh.
1065		The kingdoms of Castile and Galicia are split from the Kingdom of León.
1065		The Duchy of Limburg is established
1066		England is conquered by William, Duke of Normandy, thus bringing the Kingdom of England and the Duchy of Normandy into a personal union.
1071		Palermo, the capital of the Emirate of Sicily, is taken by the Normans. The Norman County of Sicily is established.
1076		Muslim Almoravids conquer Ghana.
1076		The kingdoms of Pamplona and Aragon are reunited in a personal union under Sancho Ramírez, who styles himself "King of the Aragonians and Pamplonese". The two kingdoms are now de jure separate entities.
1076		The Abbasid Caliphate conquers Syria.
1077		The Khwarazmian dynasty is established in Persia and Central Asia. Gurganj is the capital.
1080		The Armenian Kingdom of Cilicia is established. Tarsus is the capital.
1085		The Kingdom of Toledo is founded. Toledo is the capital.
1085		The County Palatine of the Rhine is established. Heidelberg is the capital.
1088		The Principality of Taranto is established. Taranto is the capital.
1088		Pope Urban II initiates the First Crusade in the Holy Land.
1091		Noto is conquered by the County of Sicily, completing the Norman conquest of Sicily and ending the Muslim Emirate of Sicily.
1091		The County of Holland is founded. The Hague is the capital.
1092		William Rufus, son of William the Conqueror, invades Cumberland (then part of Scotland) and incorporates it into England.
1092		The Seljuk Empire is split up.
1092		Pope Urban II awards Corsica and Sardinia to the Republic of Pisa.
1096		The County of Guelders is established. Geldern is the capital.
1097		King William II moves the capital of the Kingdom of England to London.
1097		The County of Portugal becomes part of the Kingdom of León.
1098		Crusaders conquer Edessa and found the County of Edessa.
1098		Crusaders conquer Antioch and establish the Principality of Antioch.
1099		Crusaders conquer Jerusalem and establish the Kingdom of Jerusalem.

==== 12th century ====
Year	Date	Event
1102		Start of the Union between the Kingdom of Croatia and the Kingdom of Hungary.
1102		Crusaders conquer Tartus and found the County of Tripoli.
1102		The Duchy of Westphalia is established. Arnsberg is the capital.
1108		The County of Nice is established. Nice is the capital.
1115		Taizu establishes the Jin dynasty in China.
1115		The Republic of Florence is established. Florence is the capital.
1121		The Duchy of Pomerania is established.
1122		The Kingdom of Georgia moves its capital from Kutaisi to Tbilisi.
1124		Dezong establishes the Western Liao dynasty in what is now Northwest China and Central Asia. Balasagun is the capital.
1125		The Republic of Siena is established. Siena is the capital.
1126		Gaozong establishes the Southern Song dynasty in China. Lin'an is the capital.
1126		The Jurchen conquer Kaifeng and end the Northern Song dynasty. Thus the Jin dynasty takes over in Northern China.
1130	25 December	The Norman Kingdom of Sicily is established; the Duchy of Apulia and Calabria is disestablished.
1136		The Novgorod Republic is established. Novgorod is the capital.
1137		The Duchy of Naples is annexed by the Kingdom of Sicily.
1138		The Duchy of Silesia is founded. Breslau is the capital.
1139		The Kingdom of Portugal gains independence from the Kingdom of León.
1139		The County of Portugal declares independence from the Kingdom of León, as the Kingdom of Portugal.
1140		The County of Tyrol is established.
1144		The County of Edessa is conquered by the Seljuks.
1147		The Almohad Caliphate follows the Almoravid dynasty in al-Andalus and Northwest Africa. Tinmel is the capital.
1154		The Angevin Empire is created from a personal union between the Kingdom of England and the Kingdom of France.
1156	17 September	The Duchy of Austria is established. Vienna is the capital.
1156		King Erik den helige of Sweden leads the first crusade to Finland and incorporates it with Sweden.
1157		The Margraviate of Brandenburg is established. Brandenburg an der Havel is the capital.
1157		The Grand Principality of Vladimir is established. Vladimir is the capital.
1160		The Republic of Lucca is founded. Lucca is the capital.
1162		The Viking Kingdom of Dublin is conquered by England.
1162		Alfonso II/I ascends to the thrones of the Kingdom of Aragon and the County of Barcelona, establishing the Crown of Aragon.
1162		The Principality of Catalonia follows the County of Barcelona.
1163		The Ghaznavid dynasty moves its capital from Ghazni to Lahore.
1171		Saladin establishes the Ayyubid dynasty in Egypt and Syria. Cairo is the capital.
1171		Fall of the Fatimids in Egypt.
1171		The Anglo-Norman Lordship of Ireland emerges and dominates most of the island of Ireland. The rest of the island remained under the control of various Gaelic-Irish kingdoms or chieftains, who were often at war with the Anglo-Normans.
1172		Jämtland is conquered by the Kingdom of Norway.
1174		The Ayyubid dynasty moves its capital from Cairo to Damascus.
1180		The Kingdom of Benin is created with the foundation of the capital Edo.
1180		Territories secede from the Duchy of Saxony
1180		The Duchy of Styria is established. Graz is the capital.
1181		Pomerania becomes a fief of the Holy Roman Empire
1183		The Duchy of Brabant is established. Brussels is the capital.
1185		The Second Bulgarian Empire gains independence from the Byzantine Empire under Peter IV of Bulgaria.
1185		In Japan, the Kamakura period begins with the assumption of power by the Kamakura shogunate.
1186		The Bishopric of Livonia establishes its first presence in modern Latvia.
1186		The Ghaznawid dynasty is disestablished.
1190		The Principality of Arbanon is established.
1192		Crusaders establish the Kingdom of Cyprus.
1192		The Duchy of Styria joins the Kingdom of Hungary.
1194		The Seljuk Empire is disestablished.
1197		The Kingdom of Deheubarth is disestablished.
1198		The Principality of Bohemia becomes the Kingdom of Bohemia. Prague remains the capital.
1199		The Principality of Galicia–Volhynia is established.

==== 13th century ====
Year	Date	Event
1202		The Bishopric of Livonia is renamed the Bishopric of Riga.
1204		The Kingdom of France annexes the Duchy of Normandy.
1204		The Empire of Nicaea is established as a successor state of the Byzantine Empire. Nicaea is the capital.
1204		The Empire of Trebizond is established as a successor state of the Byzantine Empire. Trabizond is the capital.
1204		Crusaders establish the Triarchy of Negroponte from areas of the Byzantine Empire. Chalcis is the capital.
1204		Crusaders establish the Kingdom of Thessalonica from areas of the Byzantine Empire. Thessaloniki is the capital.
1204		Crusaders establish the Principality of Achaea from areas of the Byzantine Empire. Andravida is the capital.
1204		After the sack of Constantinople, crusaders establish the Latin Empire, which follows the Byzantine Empire. Constantinople is the capital.
1205		The Despotate of Epirus is established as the successor state of the Byzantine Empire. Arta is the capital.
1205		Crusaders establish the Duchy of Athens from areas of the Byzantine Empire. Athens is the capital.
1206		Qutb al-Din Aibak establishes the Delhi Sultanate. Lahore is the capital.
1206		Genghis Khan establishes the Mongol Empire. Avarga is the capital.
1207	August	The Bishopric of Riga cedes one-third of its lands to the Livonian Brothers of the Sword (established in 1202).
1207		The Republic of Venice conquers the island of Crete.
1207		Crusaders establish the Duchy of the Archipelago from areas of the Byzantine Empire. Naxos is the capital.
1210		The Mongol Empire captures much of the Western Liao dynasty.
1210		The Delhi Sultanate moves its capital from Lahore to Badaun.
1212		The Principality of Anhalt is established. Weimar is the capital.
1214		The County of Luxembourg is established.
1214		The Delhi Sultanate moves its capital from Badaun to Delhi.
1214		The Angevin Empire ends.
1215		Fall of the Ghurid dynasty.
1215		The Jaffna Kingdom is established, in Sri Lanka.
1216		The Principality of Wales is founded at the Council of Aberdyfi.
1216		The Livonian Brothers of the Sword establish first presence in Southern Estonia.
1217		The Kingdom of Serbia is established.
1217		The Papal States annex Corsica.
1218		The Principality of Wales is recognized in the Treaty of Worcester.
1218		The Ayyubid dynasty moves its capital from Damascus back to Cairo.
1219		Denmark annexes the Northern Estonian counties of Revala, Harju County, Viru County, and Järva County as the Duchy of Estonia.
1220		King Vijayabahu III founds the Kingdom of Dambadeniya. The capital is Dambadeniya, in Sri Lanka.
1223		The Mongols defeat East Slavic warriors.
1224	21 July	The Livonian Brothers of the Sword cede Southern Estonia to the Bishopric of Estonia (established in 1211). The bishopric returns some of the lands to the Sword Brothers.
1224	24 July	The Bishopric of Estonia cedes Wiek to the Bishopric of Riga.
1224	August	The Bishopric of Estonia is renamed the Bishopric of Dorpat.
1224		The Kingdom of Thessalonica is conquered by the Despotate of Epirus.
1225		Thái Tông establishes the Trần dynasty in Vietnam.
1225		The town of Riga gains independence from the Bishopric of Riga.
1225		The Chagatai Khanate originates from parts of the Mongol Empire.
1226		The State of the Teutonic Order is founded. Marienburg is the capital.
1227	February	The Bishopric of Riga and the Livonian Brothers of the Sword subjugate Saaremaa, the last independent Estonian county, and the Sword Brothers conquer Danish Estonia.
1228	August	The Bishopric of Ösel-Wiek is established from the Western Estonian territory of the Bishopric of Riga. Some of its land is ceded to the Livonian Brothers of the Sword.
1230		The Emirate of Granada is established. Granada is the capital.
1230		The Crown of Castile is formed by the union of the Kingdom of León with the Kingdom of Castile.
1231		Aragon completes the Conquest of Majorca and Menorca, establishing the Kingdom of Majorca as part of the Crown of Aragon.
1231		Fall of the Khwarazmian dynasty in Persia.
1234	24 July	The Bishopric of Courland is established from the Western Latvian territory of the Bishopric of Riga.
1235	September	The Mali Empire is established.
1235		Aragon conquers Ibiza, which becomes part of the Kingdom of Majorca.
1235		Karakorum becomes the capital of the Mongol Empire.
1235		The Duchy of Brunswick-Lüneburg is established. Brunswick and Lüneburg are the capitals.
1236		The Mongols invade Northern Korea.
1236		Mindaugas establishes the Grand Duchy of Lithuania. Voruta is the capital.
1237	12 May	The Livonian Brothers of the Sword are incorporated into the Teutonic Order as the autonomous Livonian Order.
1238	7 June	The Treaty of Stensby returns Danish Estonia from the Livonian Order back to Denmark, while the order retains Jerwen.
1238		Sweden conquers central Finland.
1238		The Mongols conquer Crimea.
1238		The Bishopric of Ösel-Wiek cedes some area in and around Leal in Western Estonia to the autonomous Livonian Order of the Teutonic Order.
1238		The Kingdom of Sukhothai is founded in Siam. Sukhothai is the capital.
1240		Fall of Kievan Rus' after the Mongol conquest.
1240		The Mongols conquer Tibet.
1240		The Mongols conquer Volga Bulgaria.
1242		The Mongol Golden Horde completes its conquest of Russia. Sarai is the capital.
1242		Upon receiving the news of Ögedei Khan's death, the Mongols withdraw from Europe, though they have already subjugated significant parts of Central and Eastern Europe.
1243	26 June	The Sultanate of Rum and the Empire of Trebizond became vassals of the Mongol Empire
1245		The Crown of Aragon completes the reconquest of what would become the Kingdom of Valencia up to the limits agreed upon in the Treaty of Almizra.
1250		The Ayyubid dynasty moves its capital from Cairo to Aleppo after the loss of Egypt.
1250		Beginning of the rule of the Mamluk Sultanate over Egypt after the victory over the Mongols. Cairo is the capital.
1251		The Kingdom of Lithuania is established from the Grand Duchy of Lithuania. Kernavė is the capital.
1253		The Bishopric of Courland cedes some of its land to the autonomous Livonian Order of the Teutonic Order.
1253		The Principality of Galicia-Volhynia becomes the Kingdom of Galicia–Volhynia, a vassal state of the Golden Horde.
1254		The Mongols conquer the Dali Kingdom.
1255	20 January	The Bishopric of Riga is elevated to the Archbishopric of Riga.
1256		King Béla IV moves the capital of the Kingdom of Hungary to Buda.
1256		The Kingdom of Portugal moves its capital from Coimbra to Lisbon.
1256		The Ilkhanate originates from parts of the Mongol Empire. Maragheh is the capital.
1258	11 May	The Treaty of Corbeil formally ends French feudal overlordship of the counties in the Spanish March and Catalan counties in the March of Gothia.
1258		The Mongols conquer Baghdad, precipitating the fall of the Abbasid Caliphate.
1258		The Trần dynasty in Vietnam defeats and holds off Mongol invasions.
1259	11 August	The death of Möngke Khan sets off a series of civil wars that eventually result in the political fragmentation of the Mongol Empire into four autonomous khanates.
1260		The Mongols conquer Aleppo. Fall of the Ayyubid dynasty.
1261		The Latin Empire is dissolved, and Constantinople falls again to the Byzantine Empire.
1263		After the death of Mindaugas, the Kingdom of Lithuania becomes again the Grand Duchy of Lithuania.
1263		The Principality of Moscow is established as an appanage principality within the Grand Principality of Vladimir. Moscow is the capital.
1264		The Landgravate of Hessen is established.
1264		The Duchy of Ferrara is established. Ferrara is the capital.
1266	2 July	Caithness and the territory of the Kingdom of the Isles (the Hebrides and Mann) is ceded to the Kingdom of Scotland by the Treaty of Perth.
1268		The Mamluks conquer the Principality of Antioch.
1270		Goryeo becomes a vassal state of the Mongol Empire.
1271		Shizu establishes the Yuan dynasty in China.
1272	1 February	The Kingdom of Albania is established.
1272	10 August	Yekuno Amlak overthrows the Zagwe dynasty, establishing the Solomonic dynasty of Ethiopia. Lalibela ceases to be the capital, and the Emperor of Ethiopia rules from a continually moving encampment around his domains for the following centuries.
1272		The Yuan dynasty of China moves its capital from Shangdu to Dadu.
1273		The Kingdom of Dambadeniya moves its capital from Dambadeniya to Yapahuwa, in Sri Lanka.
1276		The Kingdom of Majorca is split from the Crown of Aragon, with each realm inherited by different sons of James I of Aragon.
1278	8 September	Andorra is granted independence from the Crown of Aragon, whereupon the Paréage of Andorra is signed, establishing a condominium between the Count of Foix and the Bishop of Urgell in the territory.
1279	19 March	The Song dynasty is conquered by the Yuan dynasty in China.
1279		The Kingdom of Majorca becomes a vassal of the Crown of Aragon.
1279		The Chola dynasty is disestablished.
1281		The second Mongol invasion of Japan fails.
1282		The Diet of Augsburg assigns the Duchy of Austria to the House of Habsburg, commencing the Habsburg monarchy.
1284		The Republic of Genoa conquers Corsica from the Papal States.
1285		The Sultanate of Ifat is established.
1286		The Sultanate of Showa is annexed into the Sultanate of Ifat.
1287		Parakramabahu III moves the capital of the Sinhala Kingdom back to Polonnaruwa, in Sri Lanka.
1289		The Mamluks conquer the County of Tripoli.
1290	February	The Archbishopric of Riga and the Livonian Brothers of the Sword conquer Semigallia, the last independent Latvian territory.
1291		The Old Swiss Confederacy is established through the merger of the cantons of Uri, Schwyz, and Unterwalden.
1291		The Mamluks expel the last crusaders from Egypt.
1291		The Mamluks conquer the Kingdom of Jerusalem.
1292		The Landgravate of Hesse becomes a principality.
1293	10 March	Sweden conquers the southeastern parts of Finland.
1293		The thalassocratic Majapahit Empire is established in Indonesia.
1295		Chambéry becomes the capital of the County of Savoy.
1295		The Duchy of Pomerania is partitioned into Pomerania-Wolgast and Pomerania-Stettin
1296		The Duchy of Saxony is divided into the Duchy of Saxe-Lauenburg and the Duchy of Saxe-Wittenberg.
1296		The Kingdom of Aragon conquers Corsica from the Republic of Genoa.
1297		The Kingdom of Dambadeniya moves its capital from Yapahuwa to Polonnaruwa, in Sri Lanka.
1299		The Ottoman Empire is established. Söğüt is the capital.
1299		The Republic of Pisa sells parts of Sardinia to the Republic of Genoa.

==== 14th century ====
Year	Date	Event
1301		France gains Barrois mouvant (the County of Bar, west of the Meuse River).
1302		The Kingdom of Naples is created by the division of the Kingdom of Sicily. Naples is the capital.
1303		Edward I of England invades Scotland again to subdue it.
1303		The Kingdom of Dambadeniya moves its capital from Polonnaruwa to Kurunagala, in Sri Lanka.
1305		France gains the County of Vivarais.
1310		The Duchy of Mirandola is founded. Mirandola is the capital.
1315		King Charles I moves the capital of the Kingdom of Hungary to Temesvár.
1316		France gains the counties of Valentinois and Diois.
1319		Crusaders establish the Duchy of Neopatras. Neopatras is the capital.
1323	12 August	The treaty of Nöteborg is signed between Sweden and Novgorod, resulting in the first true border regulation in Swedish Finland.
1323		King Charles I moves the capital of the Kingdom of Hungary to Visegrád.
1325	13 March	The Mexicas (Aztecs) establish Tenochtitlan, marking the foundation of Mexico. It is the oldest continuous capital city in the Americas.
1326		The Crown of Aragon conquers Sardinia, creating the Kingdom of Sardinia.
1327		The Delhi Sultanate moves its capital from Delhi to Daulatabad.
1328	4 May	By the Treaty of Edinburgh–Northampton, England recognizes the independence of Scotland following the expulsion of the English from Scotland by Robert the Bruce.
1330	March	The autonomous Livonian Order of the Teutonic Order gains control over the nominally free town of Riga.
1330		The Principality of Walachia gains independence from the Kingdom of Hungary.
1333		In Japan, the Kenmu Restoration follows the Kamakura shogunate.
1334		The Delhi Sultanate moves its capital from Daulatabad to Delhi.
1335		The Ottoman Empire moves its capital from Söğüt to Bursa.
1335		The Duchy of Silesia becomes part of the Kingdom of Bohemia.
1335		The Madurai Sultanate secedes from the Delhi Sultanate. Ma'bar is the capital.
1336		The Vijayanagara Empire is established in India. Vijayanagar is the capital.
1336		End of the Kenmu Restoration in Japan.
1337		The Tsardom of Vidin is founded. Vidin is the capital.
1338		The Ashikaga shogunate is founded in Japan. Kyoto is the capital.
1339		The County of Guelders becomes the Duchy of Guelders.
1341		King Magnus Eriksson of Sweden buys the county of Halland from Denmark.
1341		The Kingdom of Gampola succeeds the Kingdom of Dambadeniya in Sri Lanka. Gampola is the new capital.
1343		The Republic of Senarica is established as an independent microstate in the village of Senarica, Italy.
1346	1 November	Denmark sells and hands the Duchy of Estonia over to the Teutonic Order.
1346		The Principality of Moldova is established.
1347	7 June	The Teutonic Order leases the former Danish Estonia to its autonomous Livonian Order.
1347		England conquers Calais from France.
1347		Moghulistan is established from parts of the Chagatai Khanate.
1347		The Bahmani Sultanate is established as a secession of the Delhi Sultanate. Gulbarga is the capital.
1348		The Duchy of Mecklenburg is established.
1348		The Pskov Republic is established. Pskov is the capital.
1349		Dauphiné sold to France.
1349		The Kingdom of Galicia–Volhynia is incorporated into the Kingdom of Poland.
1350		With the foundation of the Ayutthaya Kingdom, its capital is created in Ayutthaya, instead of the former Sukhothai.
1352		The Bengal Sultanate is established. Pandua is the capital.
1353		The County of Luxembourg is raised to the status of duchy.
1354		Fa Ngum establishes Lan Xang in Laos. Luang Prabang is the capital.
1356		The Electorate of Saxony is established from Saxe-Wittenberg.
1356		The Despotate of Dobruja is established. Karvuna is the capital.
1356		The Duchy of Jülich originates from the County of Jülich.
1356		The Margraviate of Brandenburg becomes the Electorate of Brandenburg. Brandenburg an der Havel remains the capital.
1358		Duke Rudolf IV of Austria has the Privilegium Maius forged, a set of documents which purports to elevate the Duchy of Austria to the status of "Archduchy". This status remains unrecognised.
1358		The Republic of Ragusa is established as a tributary state of the Kingdom of Hungary. Ragusa is the capital.
1362		The Principality of Kiev becomes part of the Grand Duchy of Lithuania.
1363		The Ottoman Empire moves its capital from Bursa to Adrianople.
1363		The County of Tyrol becomes part of the Habsburg monarchy.
1366		The Prince-Bishopric of Liège annexes the County of Loon.
1368		Hongwu establishes the Ming dynasty in China. Yingtian and Shuntian are the capitals.
1368		Huizong establishes the Northern Yuan dynasty in what is now Northern China and Mongolia.
1368		Muhammad Shah establishes the Bruneian Empire.
1370		Timur establishes the Timurid Empire. Samarkand is the capital.
1373		First mention of the Luzon Empire.
1373		The Madurai Sultanate is annexed by the Vijayanagara Empire.
1375		The Mamluks conquer the Armenian Kingdom of Cilicia.
1375		Kara Koyunlu is established as a tribal federation. Tabriz is the capital.
1377	26 September	The Kingdom of Bosnia is established.
1377		Fall of the Srivijaya Empire in Southeast Asia.
1378		Aq Qoyunlu is established as a tribal federation.
1380		The County of Berg is raised to the status of a duchy.
1380		The Bornu Empire is established in north-central Africa.
1384		The Burgundian Netherlands are established.
1385		The Union of Krewo establishes the personal union between the Grand Duchy of Lithuania and the Kingdom of Poland.
1388		The County of Savoy receives the County of Nice.
1389		The Grand Principality of Vladimir is permanently united with the Grand Principality of Moscow.
1390		The Kingdom of Kongo is established.
1390		The Triarchy of Negroponte becomes the Kingdom of Negroponte, a colony of the Republic of Venice.
1390		The Duchy of Neopatras is conquered by the Duchy of Athens.
1392		The Joseon Dynasty succeed the Goryeo Dynasty of Korea. Hanseong is the capital.
1395		The Duchy of Milan is established. Milan is the capital.
1396		The Second Bulgarian Empire is disestablished after it is conquered by the Ottoman Empire.
1396		The Tsardom of Vidin is disestablished after it is conquered by the Ottoman Empire.
1397		The Kalmar Union between the Kingdom of Denmark, Kingdom of Norway, and Kingdom of Sweden is established.
1398		The Timurid Empire conquers Delhi.
1398		The Principality of Bayreuth and the Principality of Ansbach are established.
1399		The Principality of Piombino is established. The capital is Piombino.

==== 15th century ====
Year	Date	Event
1400		Hồ Quý Ly establishes the Hồ dynasty in Vietnam. Tây Đô is the capital.
1401		The Timurid Empire conquers Damascus.
1401		The County of Savoy gains the County of Geneva.
1403		The Ming dynasty makes Beijing the second capital after Nanjing.
1404		Owain Glyndŵr is crowned Prince of Wales, holding his Parliament at the capital, Machynlleth.
1404		The Principality of Smolensk becomes part of the Grand Duchy of Lithuania.
1405		After the death of Timur, the Timurid Empire is split into two parts. The capital is moved from Samarkand to Herat.
1406		The Republic of Pisa is disestablished and annexed into the Republic of Florence.
1407		The Ming dynasty of China conquers the Hồ dynasty of Vietnam, beginning the Fourth Chinese domination of Vietnam.
1407		Giản Định establishes the Later Trần dynasty in Vietnam.
1407		The Gujarat Sultanate is established. Ahmedabad is the capital.
1408		King Zsigmond of Luxemburg moves the capital of the Hungarian Kingdom back to Buda.
1409		Owain Glyndŵr loses Harlech Castle and his ally Edmund Mortimer dies.
1410	15 June	The defeat of the State of the Teutonic Order against the Grand Duchy of Lithuania and the Kingdom of Poland at the Battle of Tannenberg ends its eastern expansion.
1411		The Ottoman Empire annexes the Despotat of Dobruja.
1412		English rule spreads and Machynlleth ceases to assert any claim to be the capital of Wales.
1412		Parakramabahu VI moves the capital of the Sinhala Kingdom to Kotte, in Sri Lanka.
1413	7 June	The autonomous Livonian Order becomes de facto independent from its parent Teutonic Order.
1413		The Ming dynasty of China defeats the Later Trần dynasty of Vietnam.
1415	21 August	The Conquest of Ceuta marks the beginning of the Portuguese Empire.
1415		The Adal Sultanate is established.
1416		Amadeus VIII establishes the Duchy of Savoy from the County of Savoy. Chambéry remains the capital.
1417		The County of Cleves is raised to the status of a duchy. Cleves is the capital.
1417		The Principality of Wallachia becomes a vassal state of the Ottoman Empire.
1417		The Electorate of Brandenburg moves its capital from Brandenburg an der Havel to Berlin.
1422		Start of the second personal union between the Kingdom of England and the Kingdom of France.
1426		The Kingdom of Cyprus becomes a vassal state of the Mamluks.
1427		End of the Fourth Chinese domination of Vietnam.
1428		Thái Tổ establishes the Later Lê dynasty in Vietnam. Đông Kinh is the capital.
1428		Abu'l-Khayr Khan establishes the Uzbek Khanate. Chimgi-Tura is the capital.
1428		The Aztec Empire in Mexico is established from the union of three city-states.
1429		The Ryukyu Kingdom is established. Shuri is the capital.
c. 1430		The Songhai Empire becomes independent from the Mali Empire. Gao is the capital.
1431		The Khmer Empire is dissolved after the invasion of the Ayutthaya Kingdom.
1432	March	Burgundy acquires the County of Hainaut.
1432		The Principality of Achaea is annexed by the Byzantine Empire.
1434	March	The Archbishopric of Riga sells its Dondangen Parish to the Bishopric of Courland.
1434		The Republic of Genoa reconquers Corsica from the Kingdom of Aragon.
1435	1 September	The Archbishopric of Riga, the bishoprics of Courland, Dorpat and Ösel-Wiek, the autonomous Livonian Order of the Teutonic Order, and the town of Riga form the Livonian Confederation.
1438		The Khanate of Kazan splits from the Golden Horde. Kazan is the capital.
1438		The Inca Empire is established. Cusco is the capital.
1438		The Sukhothai Kingdom is annexed by the Ayutthaya Kingdom in Siam.
1441		The Khanate of Crimea splits from the Golden Horde.
1444	March	The Albanian Principalities are unified to form the Albanian League of Lezhë.
1447		Ambrosian Republic supersedes the Duchy of Milan
1450		Duchy of Milan supersedes Ambrosian Republic
1452		The Archbishopric of Riga and the autonomous Livonian Order of the Teutonic Order agree with a condominium over the nominally free town of Riga, until then under the de facto control of the Livonian Order.
1453	6 January	The Duchy of Austria becomes the Archduchy of Austria. Vienna remains the capital.
1453	29 May	The Byzantine Empire falls to the Ottoman Empire. The capital of the Ottoman Empire is moved to Constantinople (now Istanbul, Turkey). The political situation leads to the closure of the Silk Road to trade, forcing European merchants to seek sea routes to Asian markets and thereby initiating the "Age of Discovery".
1453	14 October	End of the second personal union between the Kingdom of France and the Kingdom of England after the end of the Hundred Years' War.
1453		France annexes the Duchy of Aquitaine.
1454		The State of the Teutonic Order moves its capital from Marienburg to Königsberg.
1455		The Kingdom of Imereti becomes independent from the Kingdom of Georgia. Kutaisi is the capital.
1456		The Duchy of Bouillon is founded. Bouillon is the capital.
1458		The Republic of Ragusa becomes a vassal state of the Ottoman Empire.
1458		The Duchy of Athens is annexed by the Ottoman Empire.
1459		The Teutonic Order cedes its already leased-out former Danish Estonia over to its autonomous Livonian Order.
1461		The Empire of Trebizond is conquered by the Ottoman Empire as the last successor state of the Byzantine Empire.
1462		Moghulistan splits into two parts.
1462		The uninhabited Cape Verde Islands become a colony of Portugal.
1463		The Ottoman Empire annexes the Kingdom of Bosnia.
1464		The County of East Frisia is established.
1464		The Songhai Empire conquers Timbuktu from the Mali Empire.
1466		The Second Peace treaty of Thorn.Poland gains Michałow land, Chełmno land with Toruń, Gdańsk, Pomerania, Warmia and Żuławy with Malbork and Elbląg.Teutonic order becomes a vassal of the Kingdom of Poland
1465		The Kazakh Khanate is established. Sozak is the capital.
1465		The Kingdom of Kakheti is established. Gremi is the capital.
1468		The Khanate of Sibir splits from the Golden Horde.
1468		The tribal empire of Kara Koyunlu is disestablished.
1469		The crowns of the Iberian Christian kingdoms of Castile and Aragon were united by the marriage of Isabella I of Castile and Ferdinand II of Aragon, as the Kingdom of Spain.
1470		The Triarchy of Negroponte is annexed by the Ottoman Empire.
1470		The Chimú Empire is conquered by the Inca Empire.
1471		João de Santarém discovers São Tomé and takes possession of it for the Kingdom of Portugal.
1471		The Kingdom of Portugal conquers Tangier.
1472		Ludlow becomes the administrative capital of Wales, as the site of the Council of Wales and the Marches.
1472		The Kingdom of Scotland annexes Orkney and Shetland.
1472		Beginning of the rule of the Wattasid dynasty over Morocco. Fez is the capital.
1473		Mechelen becomes the capital of the Burgundian Netherlands.
1474		The Duchy of Holstein is created from the County of Holstein-Rendsburg.
1477		The Sengoku period begins in Japan. The Ashikaga shogunate ends and Japan falls apart into small principalities.
1478		The Canary Islands are conquered by the Catholic Monarchs of Spain.
1478		The Grand Principality of Moscow annexes the Novgorod Republic.
1478		The Kingdom of Kartli is established. Tbilisi is the capital.
1479		The Albanian League of Lezhë is annexed by the Ottoman Empire.
1479		The Republic of Venice loses parts of the Adriatic coast to the Ottoman Empire.
1480	28 November	After the Great Stand on the Ugra River, the Grand Principality of Moscow ceases to be a vassal state of the Golden Horde.
1480		According to temple records, a cyclone destroys the land bridge (Adam's Bridge) connecting the Kingdom of Kandy (in present-day Sri Lanka) and Mainland India.
1481		France gains the County of Provence.
1482		The Burgundian Netherlands are disestablished and become the Austrian Netherlands as part of the Habsburg monarchy.
1482		France gains the Duchy of Burgundy.
1485		King Matthias I moves the capital of the Hungarian Kingdom to Bécs.
1485		The Astrakhan Khanate splits from the Golden Horde.
1488		Bartolomeu Dias rounds the Cape of Good Hope.
1489		The Kingdom of Cyprus falls to the Republic of Venice.
1490	2 January	The combined forces of Castile and Aragon capture the Emirate of Granada, completing Spain's Reconquista.
1490	20 May	Vasco da Gama discovers a sea route to India.
1490		King Vladislaus II moves the capital of the Hungarian Kingdom back to Buda.
1490		The Kingdom of Georgia is divided into different parts.
1492	3 May	Christopher Columbus arrives at Xamayca.
1492	12 October	While seeking a route to the East Indies, Genoese navigator Cristoforo Colombo (Christopher Columbus) lands on the island of Guanahani in the Lucayan Archipelago, which he mistakes for the Japanese archipelago. Columbus claims the archipelago for his patrons the Crowns of Castile and Aragon (Spain), and subsequently explores and claims Cuba and Hispaniola.
1493	4 May	Spanish Pope Alexander VI issues the papal bull Inter caetera granting to the Crowns of Castile and Aragon (Spain) all newly discovered lands west of the meridian 100 leagues west of any of the islands of the Azores (approximately 38°11' west of Greenwich.)
1494	7 June	Representatives of the Kingdom of Spain and the Kingdom of Portugal sign the Treaty of Tordesillas, settling the countries' boundary of conquest in the Americas (and Africa and Asia) at a meridian 46°0' west of Greenwich.
1495	21 July	The Duchy of Württemberg is established out of the County of Württemberg. Stuttgart remains the capital.
1498		Vasco da Gama reaches Mozambique and takes possession of it for Portugal.
1498		Spain creates the Province of Tierra Firme (Spanish Main) in the Americas.
1499–1501		The Safavids conquer Persia. Tabriz is the capital.

== Maps ==
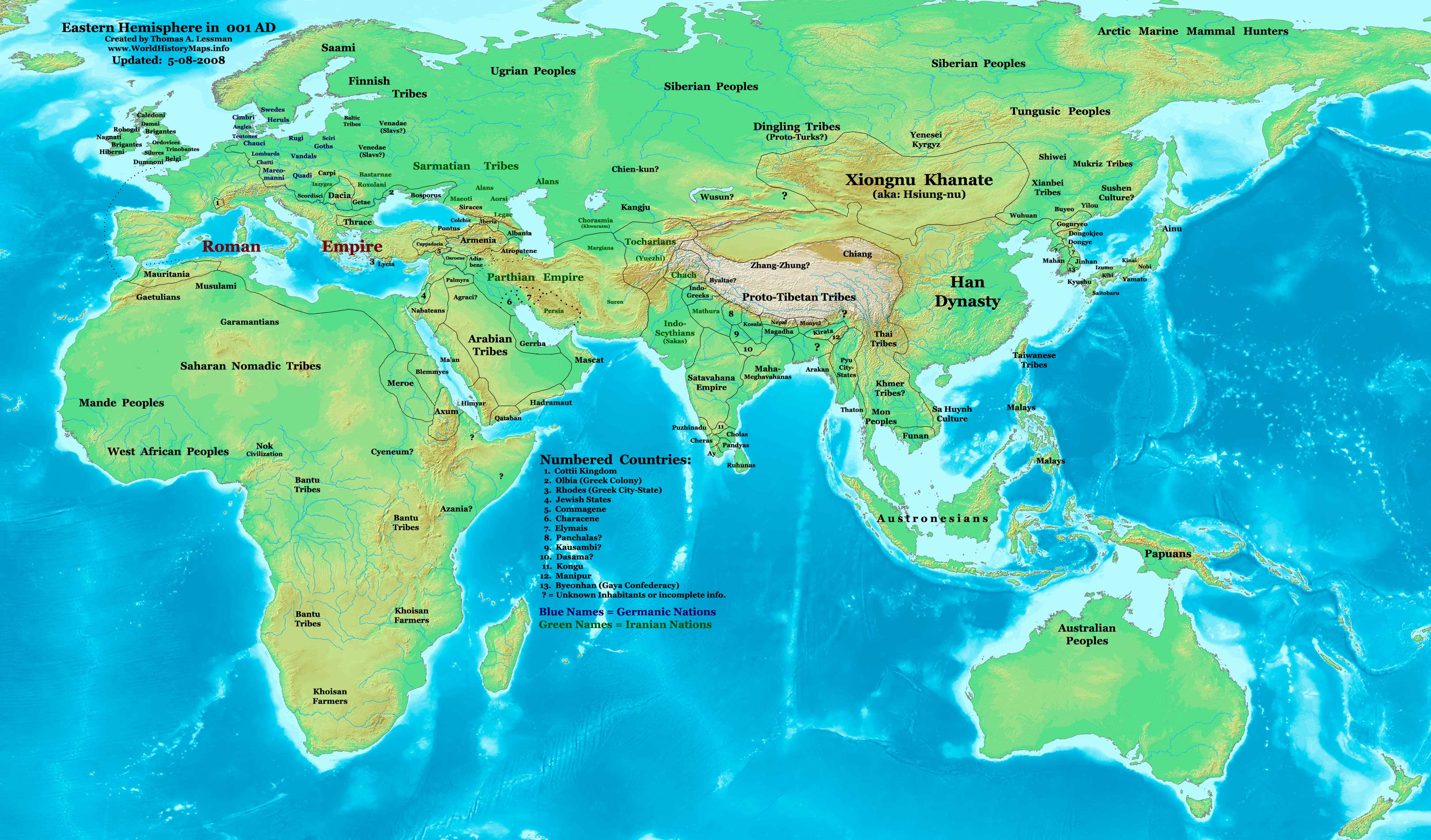
Eastern Hemisphere in 1

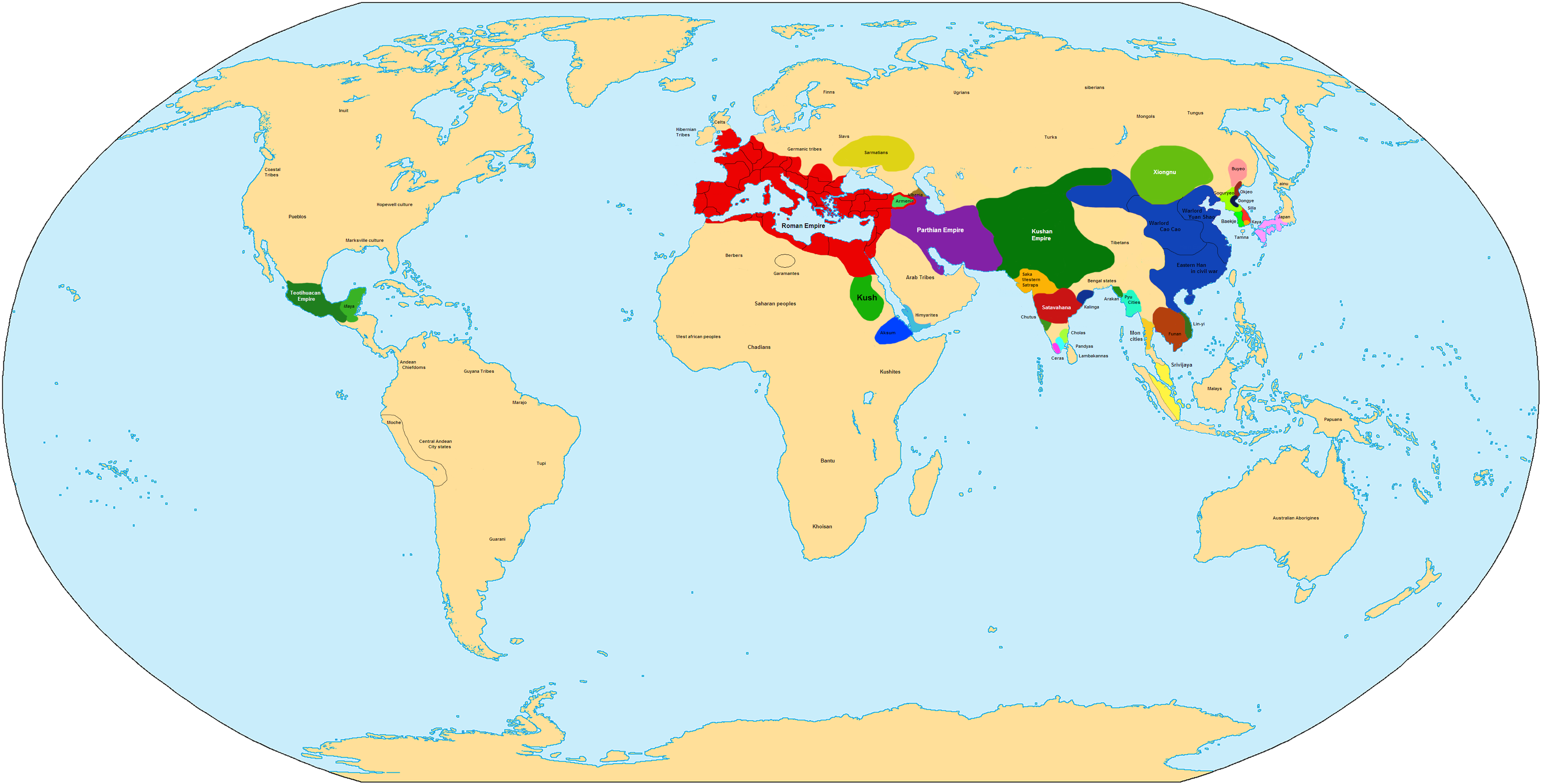
World in 200

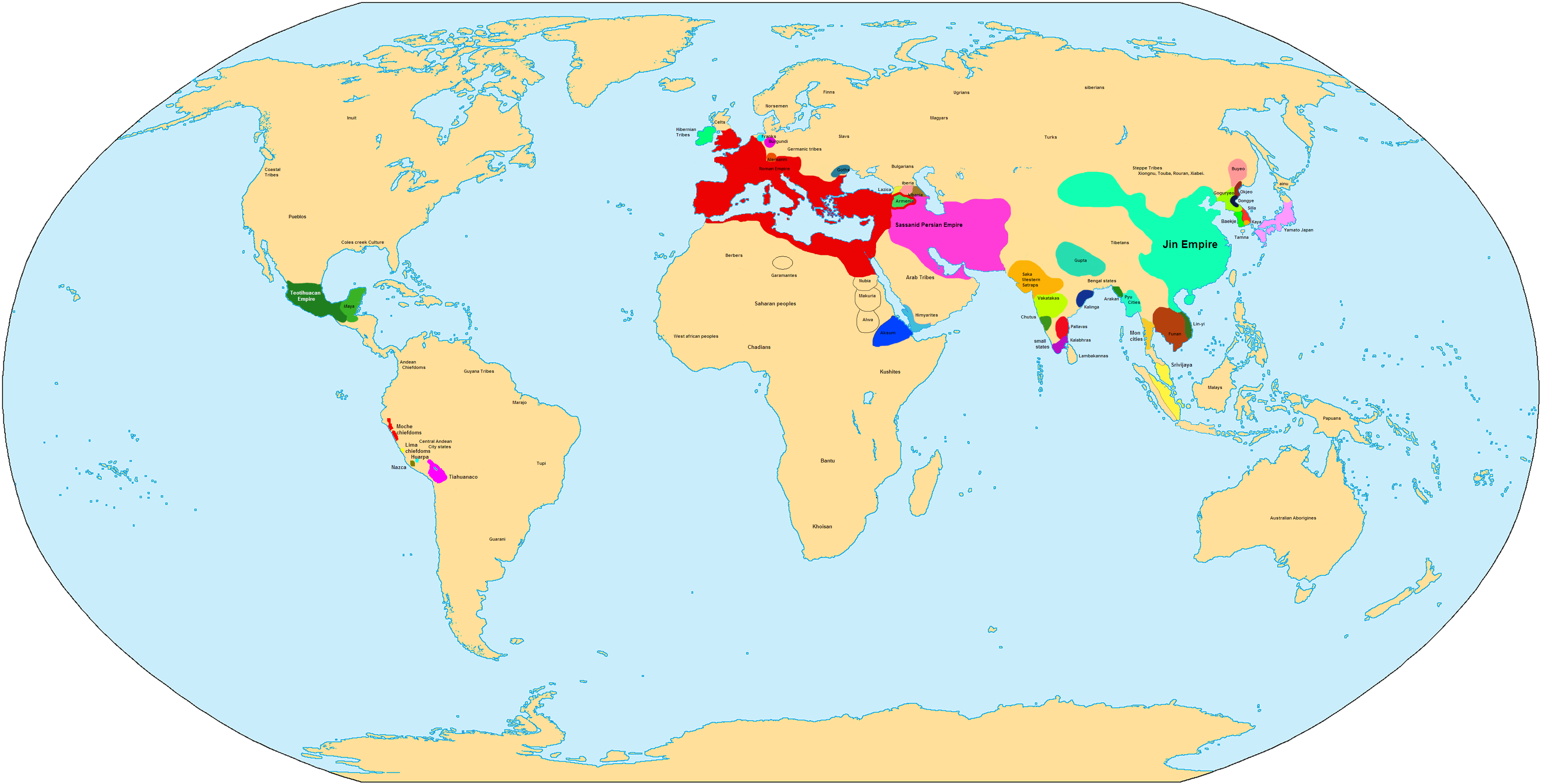
World in 300

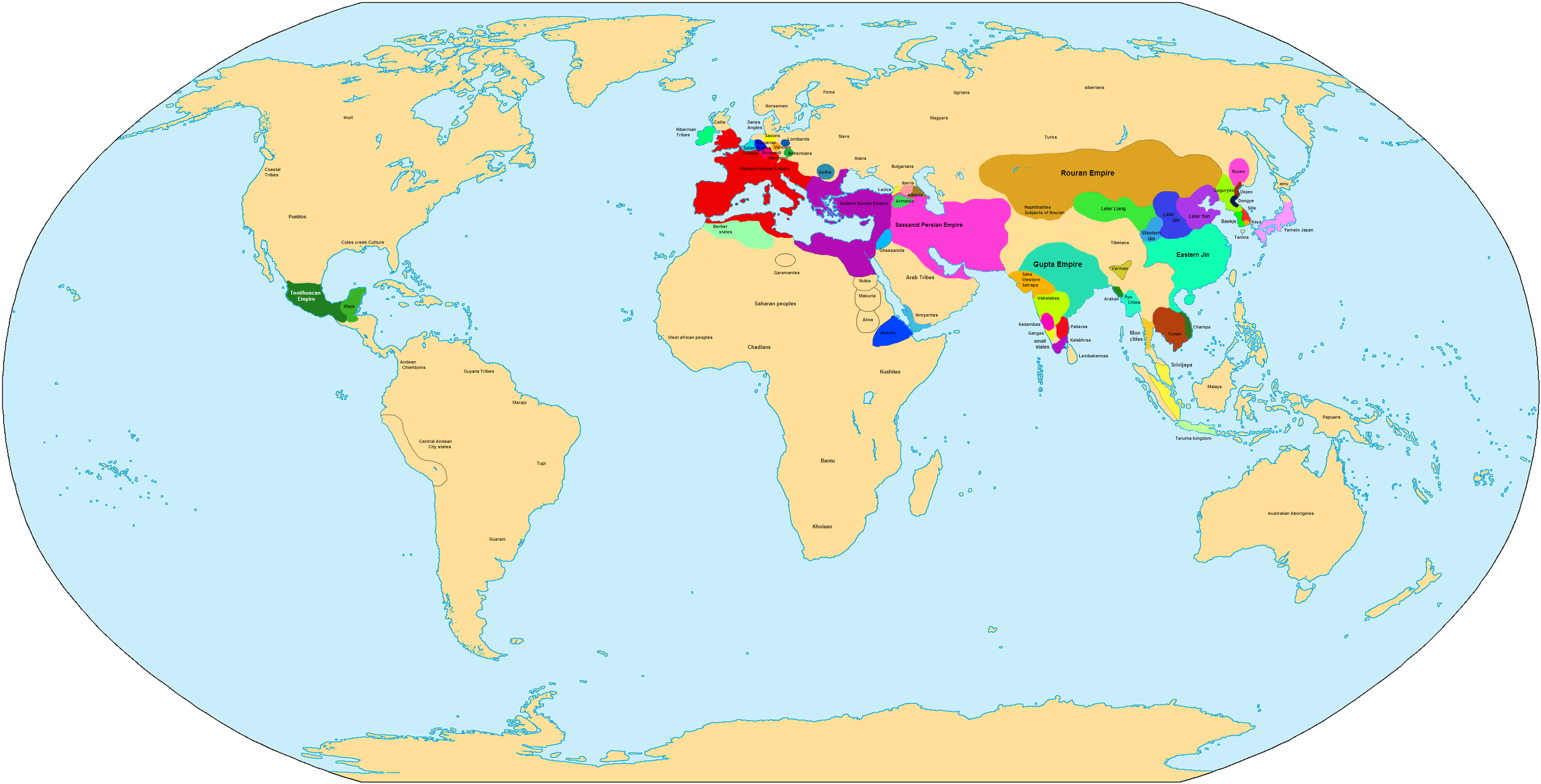
World in 400

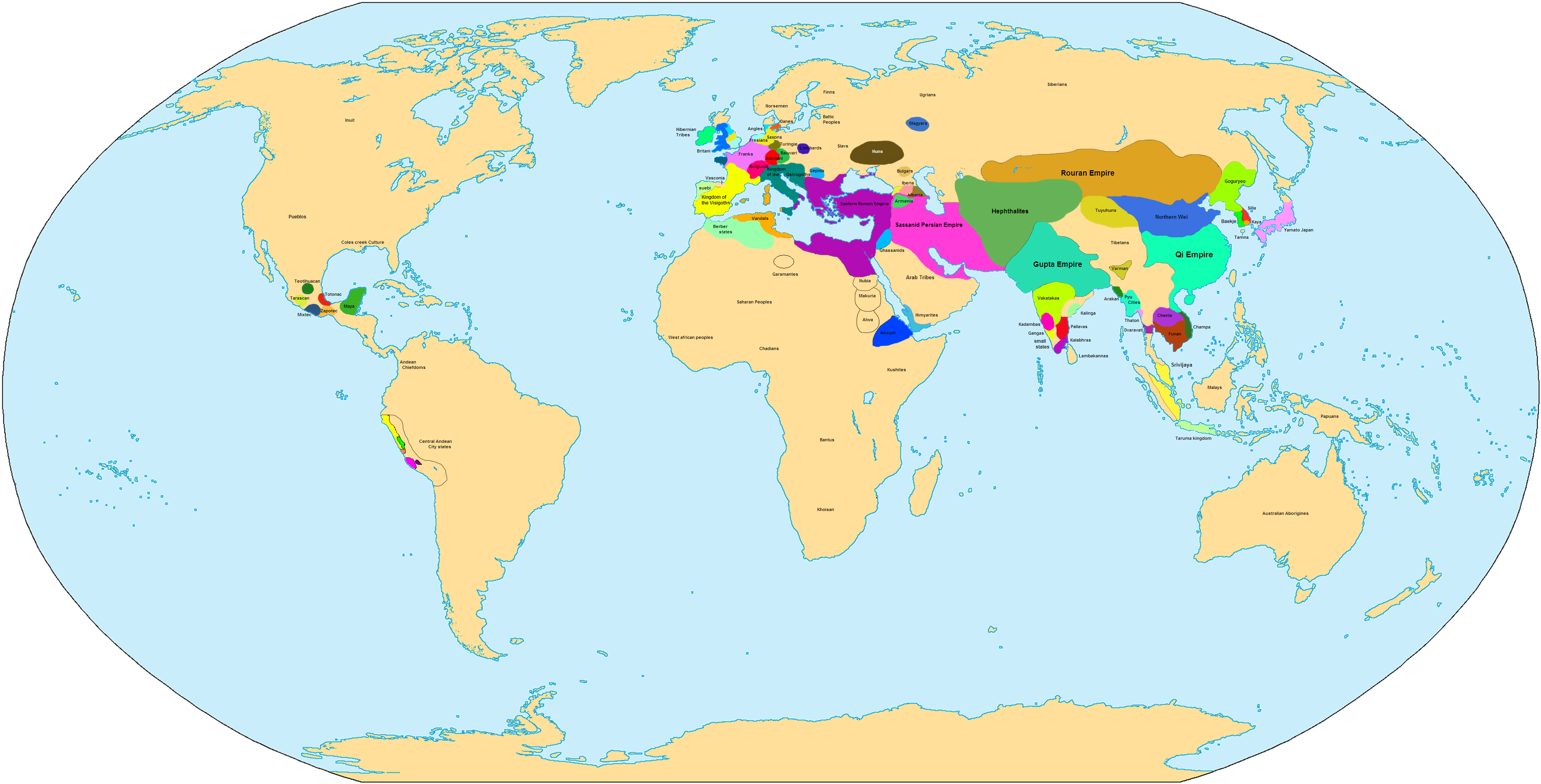
World in 500

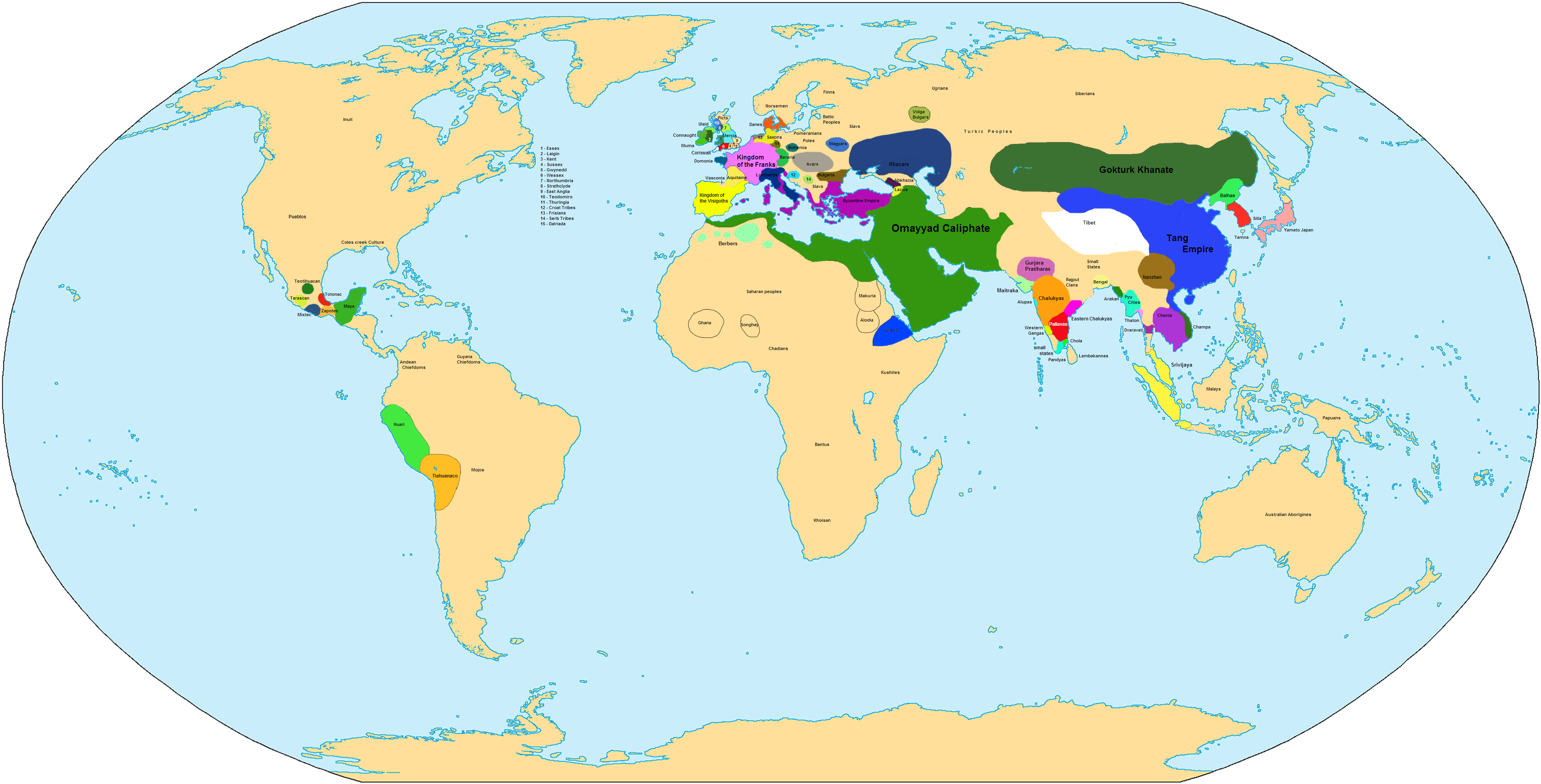
World in 700

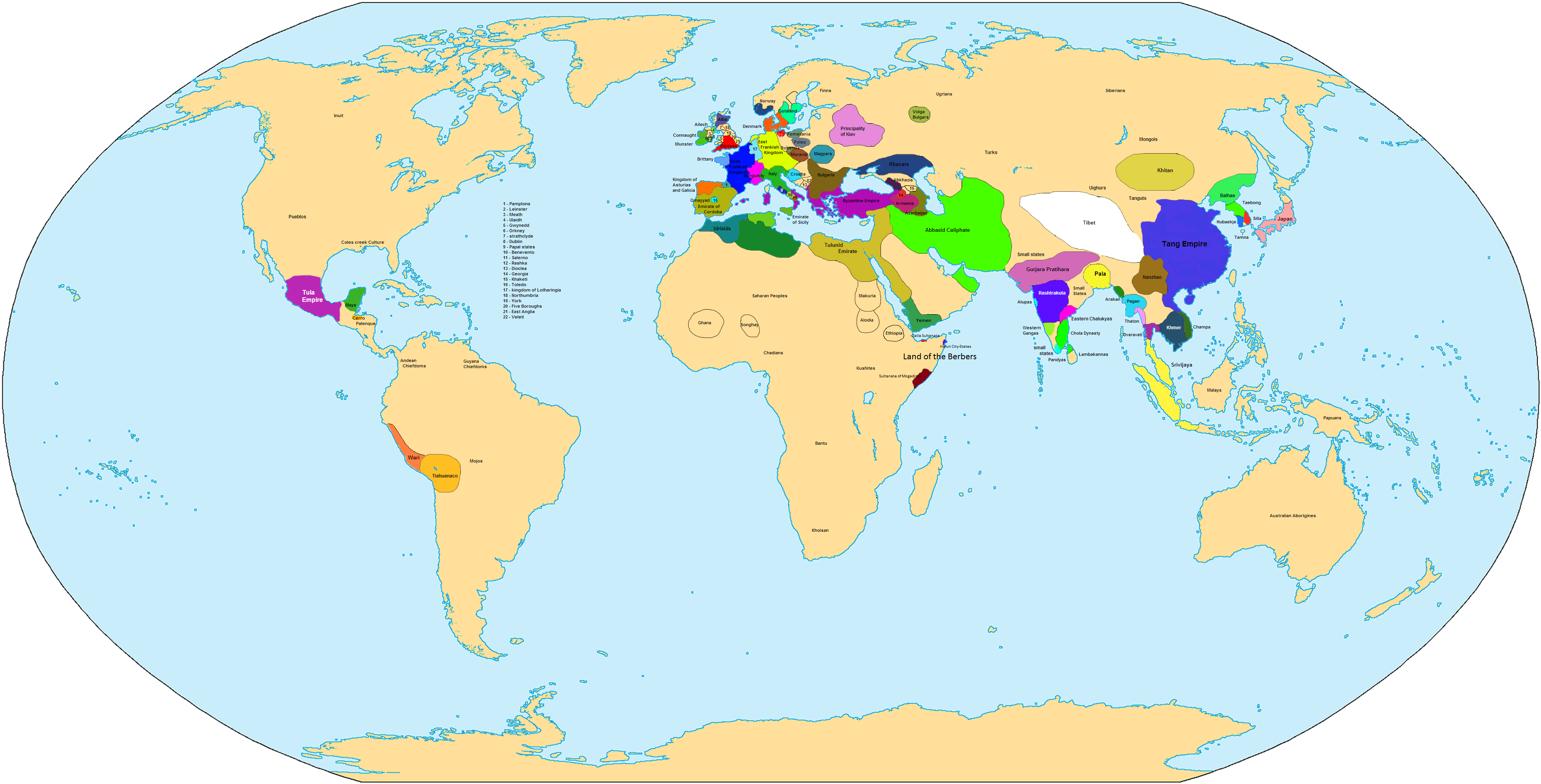
World in 900

== See also ==
- Timeline of national independence
- Geopolitics – Study of geography's effects on politics
- List of administrative division name changes
- List of city name changes
- List of national border changes (1914–present)
- Lists of political entities by century
- Sovereign state – State having the highest authority over a territory
  - List of former sovereign states
  - List of sovereign states
  - List of sovereign states by date of formation
  - List of sovereign states and dependent territories by continent
- Political history of the world

== Bibliography ==
- Chua, Amy (2018). Political Tribes: Group Instinct and the Fate of Nations. Penguin Press. ISBN 978-0399562853.
- Ryholt, Kim S.B.; Bülow-Jacobsen, Adam (1997). The Political Situation in Egypt during the Second Intermediate Period, c. 1800-1550 B.C. Museum Tusculanum Press. ISBN 978-87-7289-421-8.
- Shaw, Ian, ed. (2000). The Oxford History of Ancient Egypt. Oxford University Press. ISBN 0-19-815034-2.
