= 750s BC =

Decade

This article concerns the period 759 BC – 750 BC.

== Events and trends ==
- 756 BC—Founding of Cyzicus.
- c. 756 BC—Founding of Trabzon.
- 755 BC—Ashur-nirari V succeeds Ashur-Dan III as king of Assyria.
- 755 BC—Aeschylus, eponymous archon of Athens, dies after a reign of 23 years and is succeeded by Alcmaeon.
- 753 BC—Alcmaeon, eponymous archon of Athens, dies after a reign of 2 years. He is replaced by Charops, elected Archon for a ten-year term.

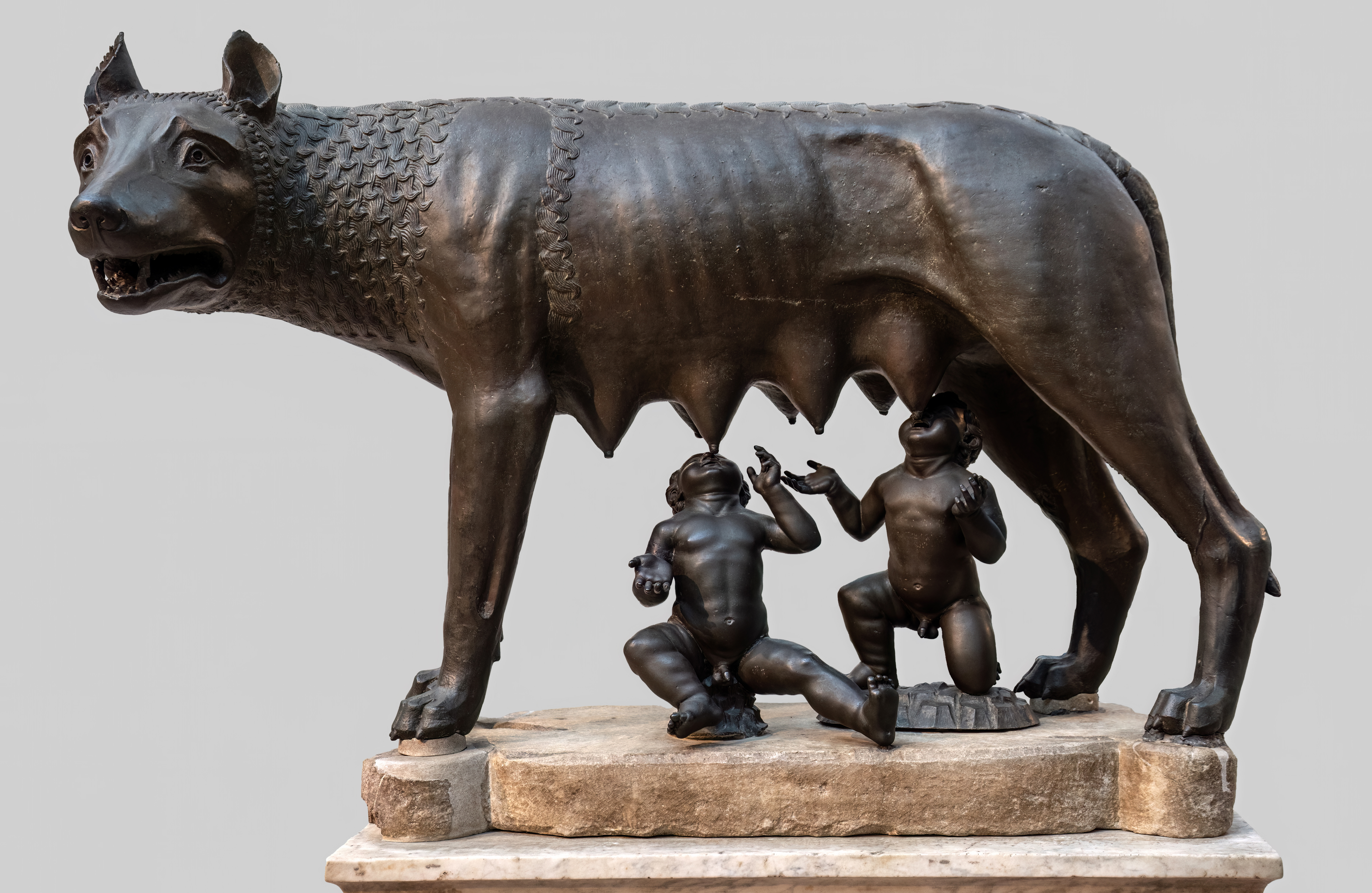
Romulus and Remus

- 753 BC—The city of Rome and the Roman Kingdom were thought to be founded, according to Roman tradition, and is ruled by Rome's first king, Romulus. Beginning of the Roman 'Ab urbe condita' calendar. Rome adopts the Etruscan alphabet, which the Etruscans themselves had adopted from the Greeks. Set by Varro, this was the most common date used.
- 752 BC—Romulus, first king of Rome, celebrates the first Roman triumph after his victory over the Caeninenses, following the Rape of the Sabine Women. He celebrates a further triumph later in the year over the Antemnates.
- 752 BC—Rome's first colonies were established.
- 752 BC—Diocles of Messenia won the seventh Ancient Olympic Games.
- 752 BC (or 745 BC)—Menahem succeeds Shallum of Israel as king of the ancient Kingdom of Israel.
- 752 BC—Piye succeeds Kashta as Kushite king, and conquers Egypt founding the Twenty-fifth Dynasty of Egypt.
- 752 BC—Visakhayupa succeeds Palaka as emperor of Magadha.
- 751 BC—First pyramids built by the Nubians in El-Kurru
- 750 BC—King Sardur II shows the cities in the kingdom of Urartu strengthen against the Cimmerians.
- 750 BC—The Ionian Greeks found the cities of Cumae and Naples in the Gulf of Naples.
- 750 BC—Romulus, the legendary co-founder of Rome, holds the first Roman triumph to celebrate a military victory following the Rape of the Sabine Women.
- c. 750 BC—Man and Centaur, perhaps from Olympia, is made. It is now at the Metropolitan Museum of Art, New York.
- c. 750 BC—Greeks establish colonies in Italy and Sicily.
- c. 750 BC – 700 BC—Funerary Vase (Krater), from the Dipylon Cemetery, Athens, is made. Attributed to the Hirschfield workshop. It is now at The Metropolitan Museum of Art, New York.

== Significant people ==
- Shoshenq V, Pharaoh of the Twenty-second dynasty of Egypt (767–730 BC)
- Osorkon III, Pharaoh of the Twenty-third dynasty of Egypt (787–759 BC)
- Takelot III, Pharaoh of the Twenty-third dynasty of Egypt (764–757 BC)
- Rudamun, Pharaoh of the Twenty-third dynasty of Egypt (757–754 BC)
- Ini, Pharaoh of the Twenty-third dynasty of Egypt (754–715 BC)
- Niumateped, chief of the Libu (775–750 BC)
- Titaru, chief of the Libu (758–750 BC)
- Ker, chief of the Libu (750–745 BC)
- Manava, author of the Indian geometric text of Sulba Sutras. (b. 750 BC)
- Uzziah, King of Judah (791-740 BC)

== Births ==
- 757 BC—Birth of Duke Zhuang of Zheng

== Deaths ==
- 759 BC—Alexander, king of Corinth, was killed by his successor Telestes.
- 755 BC—Aeschylus, eponymous archon of Athens, dies after a reign of 23 years and is succeeded by Alcmaeon.
- 752 BC—Zechariah of Israel, king of the northern Israelite Kingdom of Israel, and son of Jeroboam II.
- 752 BC—Alara of Nubia, king of Kush.
- 750 BC—King Xie of Zhou
