= 720s BC =

Decade

This article concerns the period 729 BC – 720 BC.

== Events and trends ==
- 728 BC—Piye invades Egypt, conquering Memphis, and receives the submission of the rulers of the Nile Delta. He founds the Twenty-fifth Dynasty of Egypt.
- 728 BC—Diocles of Corinth wins the stadion race at the 13th Olympic Games.
- 727 BC—Babylonia makes itself independent of Assyria, upon the death of Tiglath-Pileser III.
- 725 BC—Shalmaneser V starts a 3-year siege of Israel.
- 725 BC—Sparta conquers the neighboring region of Messenia and takes over the land.
- 724 BC—The Assyrians start a four-year siege of Tyre.
- 724 BC—The diaulos footrace is first introduced at the Olympics.

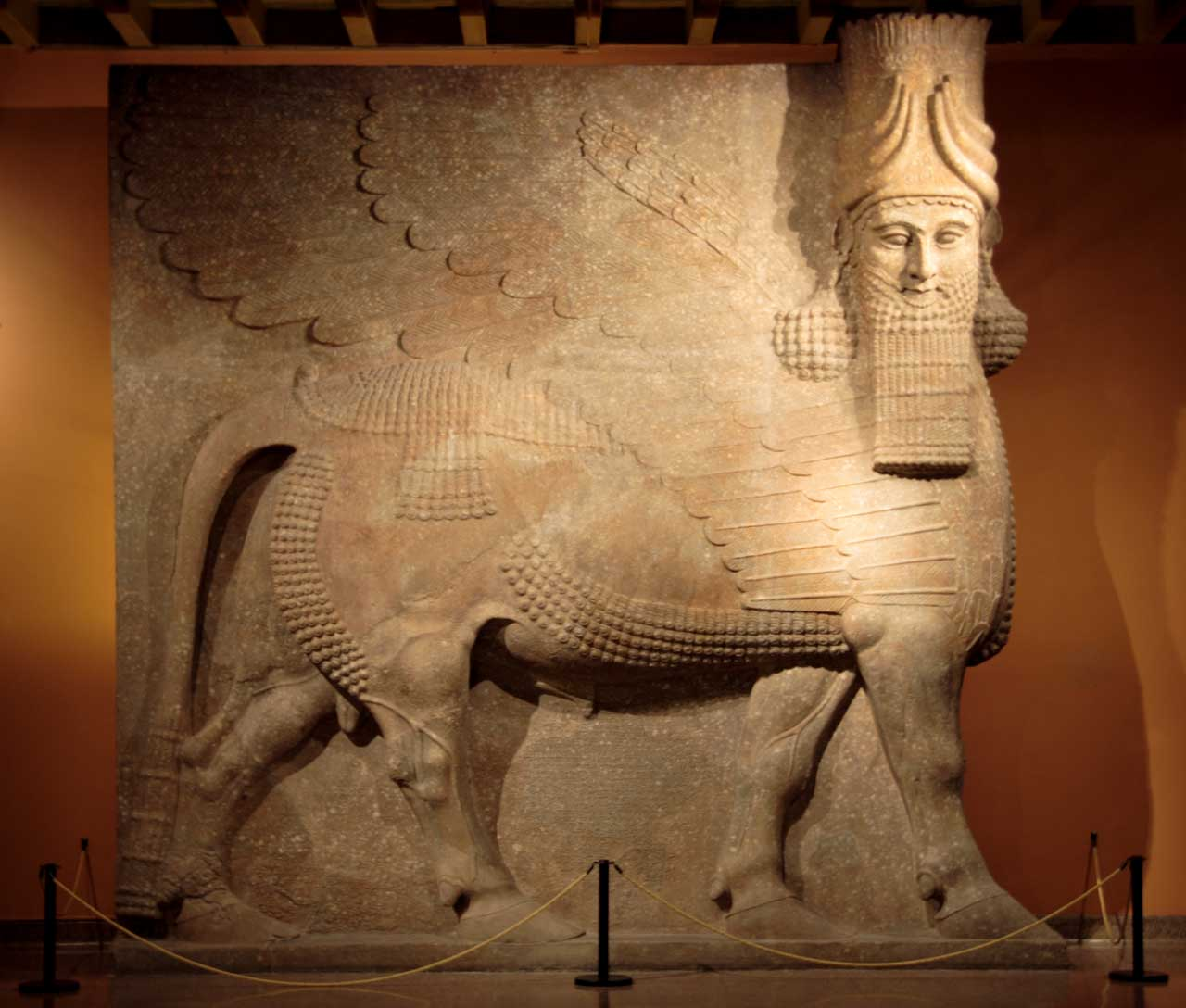
A lamassu from the palace of Sargon II at Dur-Sharrukin.

- 724 BC—Desmon of Corinth wins the stadion race at the 14th Olympic Games.
- 722 BC—In the fifth month of the year during the summer, Duke Zhuang of Zheng defeats his younger brother Gongshu Duan (共叔段) north of present-day Yanling County.
- 722 BC—Northern Kingdom of Israel is conquered by Assyrian king Sargon II.
- 722 BC—Duke Yin accedes to the throne of Lu in China, the first event recorded in the Spring and Autumn Annals.
- 721 BC—The Assyrians conquer the tribes of northern Israel.
- 721 BC—Sargon II starts to rule. He builds a new capital at Dur Sharrukin (modern Khorsabad).
- 720 BC—End of the Assyrian siege of Tyre.
- 720 BC—Orsippus of Megara wins the stadion race at the 15th Olympic Games.
- 720 BC—The "dolichos" footrace is introduced at the Olympics.
- 720 BC—Guardian figure (pictured, right), from the entrance to the throne room at palace of Sargon II is made. It is now kept in the Oriental Institute, Chicago.

== Significant people ==
- 729 BC—Tiglath-Pileser III officially crowned sovereign of Asia in Babylon.
- 729 BC—Hezekiah succeeds Ahaz as king of Judah (or 726 BC).
- 729 BC—Luli succeeds Mattan II as king of Tyre.
- 728 BC—Death of Tiglath-Pileser III, king of Assyria (or 727 BC).
- 727 BC—Shalmaneser V becomes king of Assyria (dies 722 BC).
- 727 BC—Tefnakhte founds the Twenty-fourth Dynasty of Egypt.
- 726 BC—Hezekiah succeeds Ahaz as king of Judah (or 729 BC).
- 725 BC—Bakenranef (also known as Bocchoris) succeeds his father Tefnakhte as king of the Twenty-fourth Dynasty of Egypt.
- 724 BC—Ahaz, king of Judah (740 BC–726 BC) dies.
- 722 BC—Shalmaneser V, king of Assyria, dies.
- 722 BC—Sargon succeeds Shalmaneser V as king of Assyria.
- 721 BC—Shabaka succeeds his father Piye as king of the Twenty-fifth Dynasty of Egypt.
- 720 BC—Shabaka kills Bakenranef (Bocchoris), ending the Twenty-fourth Dynasty of Egypt
- 720 BC—Death of King Ping of the Zhou dynasty of China.
- 720 BC—Birth of Guan Zhong, political adviser of Qi in eastern ancient China.
