= 700s BC (decade) =

Decade

This article concerns the period 709 BC – 700 BC.

== Events and trends ==
- 708 BC—Traditional date of the foundation of Croton (modern Crotone) by colonists from Achaea.
- 708 BC—Tellis of Sicyon wins the stadion race at the 18th Olympic Games.
- 707 BC—Spring and Autumn period: Duke Zhuang of Zheng defeats the armies of King Huan of Zhou, becoming the first vassal of the ruler of China to revolt.
- 706 BC—Traditional date when Spartan immigrants found Taras (Tarentum, the modern Taranto) colony in southern Italy.
- 706 BC—The Assyrian royal court is moved to Dur-Sharrukin.
- 705 BC—Sennacherib succeeds his father Sargon II.
- 704 BC—Sennacherib moves the capital of Assyria to Nineveh.
- 704 BC—Menos of Megara wins the stadion race at the 19th Olympic Games.
- 701 BC—November 10—King Hezekiah of Judah, backed by the Kingdom of Kush, revolts against King Sennacherib of Assyria. Sennacherib sacks many Israelite cities, but fails in his attempt to take Jerusalem.
- 700 BC—The Scythians start settling in Cimmerian areas, slowly replacing the previous inhabitants.
- 700 BC—End of the Villanovan culture in northern Italy and rise of the Etruscan civilization.
- 700 BC—The Upanishads, a sacred text of Hinduism, are written around this time.
- 700 BC—Atheradas of Laconia wins the stadion race at the 20th Olympic Games.
- 700 BC—Assyrian king Sennacherib launches another campaign into the Chaldean region, where the Babylonian rebel Merodach-Baladan II has been conspiring against him. Merodach-Baladan takes refuge in Elam, north of the Persian Gulf.
- 700 BC—Babylon's Assyrian-raised puppet king Bel-ibni is deposed after a 3-year reign and sent into exile. He is replaced by Sennacherib's son, Ashur-nadin-shumi.
- c. 700 BC—Geometric period of vases ends in Ancient Greece. Orientalizing period of vases starts. It starts in Corinth.
- c. 700 BC—Hesiod writes "Theogony".
- c. 700 BC–509 BC—Etruscan supremacy period in Italy.
- c. 700 BC — Construction of the Temple of Yeha in Ethiopia
- After c. 700 BC – Cities again begin to appear on the Indian subcontinent, especially in the north.

== Deaths ==
- 705 BC—Sargon II, king of Assyria.
- 705 BC—Marquis Xiaozi of Jin, ruler of the state of Jin.
- 704 BC—Duke Xian of Qin
- 702 BC—Merodach Baladan, Babylonian ruler
- 702 BC—Shabaka, Kushite pharaoh of the Twenty-fifth Dynasty of Egypt
- 701 BC—Duke Zhuang of Zheng, China.

== Births ==
- 708 BC—Chuzi I, duke of Qin
- 705 BC—Achaemenes, eponymous apical ancestor of the Achaemenid dynasty of rulers from Persis.
- 700 BC—Mentuemhat, Egyptian government official.
