= 760s BC =

Decade

This article concerns the period 769 BC – 760 BC.

== Events and trends ==
- 763 BC—June 15—A solar eclipse at this date (in month Sivan) is used to fix the chronology of the Ancient Near East.
- Amaziah, king of Judah, dies and is succeeded by his son Uzziah.

== Significant people ==
- Argishtis I of Urartu (r. 786–764 BC)
- Amaziah of Judah (co-ruled Judah with Uzziah c. 792–768 BC, according to Edwin R. Thiele)
- Archilaus, king of Sparta
- Marduk-apla-usur, king of Babylon (r. c. 780–769 BC)
- Eriba-Marduk, king of Babylon (r. c. 769–761 BC)
- Rivallo (legendary king of the Britons)
- Alara of Nubia, King of Kush (r. 795–c. 765 BC)
- Uzziah, king of Judah (ruled Judah solely until c. 751 BC)
