= 780s BC =

Decade

This article concerns the period 789 BC – 780 BC.

== Events and trends ==
- 783 BC—Shalmaneser IV succeeds his father Adad-nirari III as king of Assyria.
- 782 BC—Founding of Erebuni Fortress by the orders of King Argishtis I of Urartu at the site of current-day Yerevan, Armenia
- 782 BC—Death of King Xuan of Zhou, king of the Zhou dynasty of China.
- 781 BC—King You of Zhou becomes king of the Zhou dynasty of China.
- 781 BC—Some say the oldest date-verified Chinese recording of a Solar Eclipse happened on June 4th of this year, but others argue that it was in 735 BC.
- 780–560 BC—The Establishment of The Greek Colonies.
