= Alcmaeon of Athens =

Last Archon of Athens of the Meontid lineage from 755 to 753 BC

Alcmaeon (Ancient Greek: Ἀλκμαίων) was the last perpetual Archon of Athens of the Meontid lineage. In 753 BC, he was succeeded by his brother Charops, the first archon with a limited term of office of ten years.
