= 770s BC =

Decade

776 BC in various calendars
Gregorian calendar	776 BC; DCCLXXVI BC
Ancient Egypt era	XXIII dynasty, 105
Ancient Greek Olympiad (summer)	1st Olympiad (victor)¹
Assyrian calendar	3975
Balinese saka calendar	N/A
Bengali calendar	−1369 – −1368
Berber calendar	175
Buddhist calendar	−231
Burmese calendar	−1413
Byzantine calendar	4733–4734
Chinese calendar	甲子年 (Wood Rat); 1922 or 1715 — to — 乙丑年 (Wood Ox); 1923 or 1716
Coptic calendar	−1059 – −1058
Discordian calendar	391
Ethiopian calendar	−783 – −782
Hebrew calendar	2985–2986
- Hindu calendars
Vikram Samvat	−719 – −718
Shaka Samvat	N/A
Kali Yuga	2325–2326
Holocene calendar	9225
Iranian calendar	1397 BP – 1396 BP
Islamic calendar	1440 BH – 1439 BH
Javanese calendar	N/A
Julian calendar	N/A
Korean calendar	1558
Minguo calendar	2687 before ROC 民前2687年
Nanakshahi calendar	−2243
Thai solar calendar	−233 – −232
Tibetan calendar	ཤིང་ཕོ་བྱི་བ་ལོ་ (male Wood-Rat) −649 or −1030 or −1802 — to — ཤིང་མོ་གླང་ལོ་ (female Wood-Ox) −648 or −1029 or −1801

This article concerns the period 779 BC – 770 BC.

== Events and trends ==
- 778 BC—Agamestor, Archon of Athens, dies after a reign of 17 years and is succeeded by his son Aeschylus.
- 777 BC—Death of Pārśva or Pārśvanātha (c. 877–777 BCE), the twenty-third Tirthankara of Jainism.
- 776 BC—First Olympic Games, according to Diodorus Siculus (of the 1st century BC). The games would continue to 394 AD. The Olympiad year would later be used by historians to reckon dates in a unified fashion where different Greek calendar systems were in use.
- 774 BC— Shalmaneser IV begins his campaign to Namri in Urartu and a final campaign to Damascus
- 773 BC—Ashur-Dan III succeeds his brother Shalmaneser IV as king of Assyria.
- 771 BC—Spring and Autumn period of China's history begins with the decline of the Zhou dynasty as Haojing is sacked by Quanrong nomads, King You is killed and his successor, King Ping is forced to move the capital to Chengzhou. End of the Western Zhou Dynasty. Beginning of Eastern Zhou Dynasty.
- 770 BC—Beginning of the Eastern Zhou dynasty in China as King Ping of Zhou becomes the first King of the Zhou to rule from the new capital of Chengzhou (later known as Luoyang).
- 770 BC—The Huangdi Neijing (Canon of Internal Medicine), considered the earliest extant medical book, is believed to have been compiled after this year (770 BC–221 BC).

== Births ==
- 771 BC—Traditional birth date of Romulus and Remus, Romulus as the traditional founder of Rome (according to Plutarch, possibly mythical).

== Deaths ==
- 771 BC—King You of Zhou, King of the Zhou Dynasty of China.
