= 730s BC =

Decade

This article concerns the period 739 BC – 730 BC.

== Events and trends ==
- 739 BC—Hiram II succeeds Ithobaal II as king of Tyre.
- 738 BC—King Tiglath-Pileser III of Assyria invades Israel, forcing it to pay tribute.
- 738 BC—The Biskupin settlement northeast of Poznań (Poland) is built.
- 737 and 736 BC—King Tiglath-Pileser III of Assyria invades Iran, conquering the Medes and Persians and slaughtering, enslaving or deporting many.
- 736 BC—Leochares of Messenia wins the stadion race at the eleventh Olympic Games.
- 735 BC—Naxos in Sicily founded as a colony of Chalcis in Euboea. (traditional date)
- 734 BC—Syracuse founded in Sicily as a joint colony of Corinth and Tenea, under the leadership of Archias of Corinth.
- 733 BC—King Tiglath-Pileser III of Assyria conquers the Northern Kingdom of Israel (Samaria), and exiles its inhabitants.
- 732 BC—King Tiglath-Pileser III of Assyria seizes Damascus, executes Rezin, King of the Arameans, and deports the Aramaean inhabitants to Kir of Moab. (probable date)
- 732 BC—King Tiglath-Pileser III of Assyria defeats the Arab queen Samsi in battle and forces her to pay tribute to him.
- 732 BC—Hoshea becomes the last king of Israel.
- 732 BC—Oxythemis of Cleonae/Coroneia wins the stadion race at the twelfth Olympic Games.
- 730 BC—Northern Egypt ceases to be ruled by Libyan pharaohs.
- 730 BC—Osorkon IV succeeds Pedubast II as king of the Twenty-second Dynasty of Egypt. (approximate date)
- 730 BC—Piye succeeds his father, Kashta, as king of the Nubian kingdom of Napata.
- 730 BC—Mattan II succeeds Hiram II as king of Tyre.
- 730 BC—Leontini in Sicily is founded by colonists from Naxos.

== Significant people ==
- Xuan Jiang, Chinese Duchess.
