= 710s BC =

Decade

This article concerns the period 719 BC – 710 BC.

== Events and trends ==
- 719 BC—Zhou Huan Wang of the Zhou dynasty becomes ruler of China.
- 719 BC—Revolt led by Yahu-Bihdi in Hamath is suppressed. Much of the population deported to Samaria and Hamath destroyed.
- 718 BC—Gyges becomes the ruler of Lydia.
- c. 717 BC—The Sicilian colony of Chersonesos is established.
- 717 BC—Assyrian king Sargon conquers the Neo-Hittite state of Carchemish.
- 717 BC—Sargon II founds a new capital for Assyria at Dur-Sharrukin.
- 717–716 BC — Sargon II leads his armies in a sweeping attack along the Philistine coast, where he defeats the pharaoh.
- 717 BC—Roman legend marks this as the date that Romulus ended his rule. Interregnum starts.
- 716 BC—Pythagoras of Laconia wins the stadion race at the 16th Olympic Games.
- 715 BC—Interregnum ends. Start of the reign of the second King of Rome — Numa Pompilius.
- c. 715 BC—Conquest of Messenia by Sparta ends.
- 713 BC—Numa Pompilius, King of Rome, reforms the Roman calendar, introducing January and February and adding 5 days to the calendar.
- 713 BC—Olmecs establish Monte Albán, the sacred city, and continue building pyramids.
- 712 BC—Numa Pompilius creates the office of Pontifex Maximus.
- 712 BC—Polus of Epidaurus wins the stadion race at the 17th Olympic Games.
- c. 710 BC—The Medes are united.

=== Year unknown ===
- Judah, Tyre and Sidon revolt against Assyria.

== Births and death ==
- c. 716 BC—Ahaz, king of Judah, dies.
- 716 BC—Piye dies.
- 715 BC—Osorkon IV dies, ending the Twenty-second Dynasty of Egypt.
- 713 BC—Birth of semi-legendary Zalmoxis in Dacia.
- February 13 711 BC (according to legend)—Birth of semi-legendary Emperor Jimmu, the first Emperor of Japan.
