= 740s BC =

Decade

This article concerns the period 749 BC – 740 BC.

== Events and trends ==
- 748 BC – Anticles of Messenia wins the stadion race at the eighth Olympic Games.
- 747 BC – February 26 – Nabonassar becomes king of Babylon.
- 747 BC – Meles becomes king of Lydia.
- 747 BC – The Lusatian culture city at Biskupin is founded.
- 746 BC – Founding of Rome according to Livy's ab urbe condita
- 746 BC – A revolt in Kalhu brings Tiglath-Pileser III to the throne of the Neo-Assyrian Empire
- 746 BC – End of the reign of Zechariah of Israel (746-745 BC).
- 746 BC – Suggested start of the reign of Menahem Ben Gadi of Israel.
- c. 744 BC – Piye starts to rule in parts of Ancient Egypt.
- 745 BC – The crown of Assyria seized by Pul, who takes the name Tiglath-Pileser III.
- 745 BC – Legendary death of Titus Tatius Roman King (Diarchy with Romulus ).
- 744 BC – Xenocles of Messenia wins the stadion race at the ninth Olympic Games.
- 743 BC – Duke Zhuang of the Chinese state of Zheng comes to power.
- 743 BC – Beginning of the First Messenian War.
- 740 BC – Tiglath-Pileser III conquers the city of Arpad in Syria after two years of siege.
- 740 BC – Start of Ahaz's reign of Judah.
- 740 BC – Dotades of Messenia wins the stadion race at the tenth Olympic Games.

== Deaths ==
- 746 BC – Jeroboam II, thirteenth king of the Kingdom of Israel
- 746 BC – Marquis Wen of Jin, eleventh ruler of the Chinese state of Jin
- 745 BC – Suggested date for the death of King Shallum of the ancient Kingdom of Israel
