= 1st millennium BC =

Millennium between 1000 BC and 1 BC

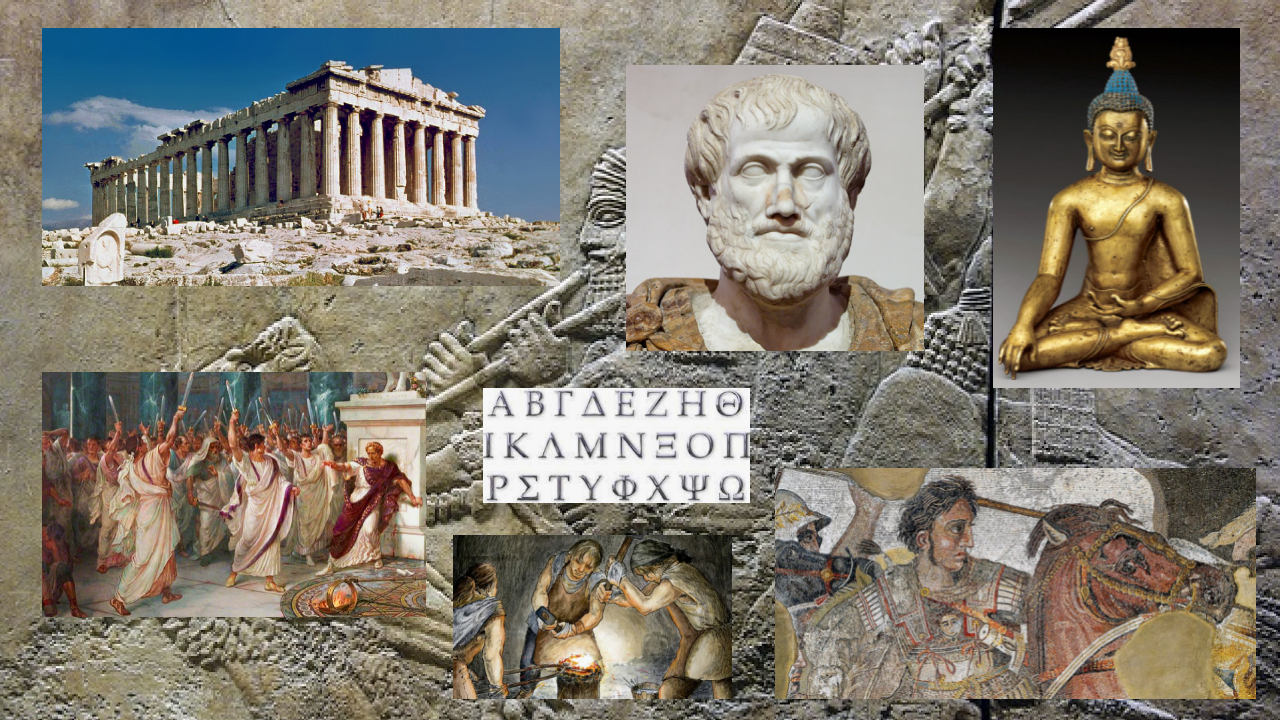
From top left clockwise: The Parthenon, a former temple in Athens, Greece; Aristotle, Greek philosopher; Gautama Buddha, a spiritual teacher and the founder of Buddhism; Wars of Alexander the Great last from 336 BC to 323 BC; Letters of the Greek alphabet; People working during the Iron Age; Roman dictator, Julius Caesar is assassinated by the Roman Senate in 44 BC. (Background: A mural from the Assyrian Empire which dissolved in the 7th century BC)

The 1st millennium BC, also known as the last millennium BC, was the period of time lasting from the years 1000 BC to 1 BC (10th to 1st centuries BC; in astronomy: JD 1356182.5 – 1721425.5). It encompasses the Iron Age in the Old World and sees the transition from the Ancient Near East to classical antiquity.

World population roughly doubled over the course of the millennium, from about 100 million to about 200–250 million after the birth of Jesus Christ and the establishment of the Julio-Claudian dynasty led by its founder Octavian.

== Overview ==
The Neo-Assyrian Empire dominates the Near East in the early centuries of the millennium, supplanted by the Achaemenid Empire in the 6th century. Ancient Egypt is in decline, and falls to the Achaemenids in 525 BC.

In Greece, Classical Antiquity begins with the colonization of Magna Graecia and peaks with the conquest of the Achaemenids and the subsequent flourishing of Hellenistic civilization (4th to 2nd centuries).

The Roman Republic supplants the Etruscans and then the Carthaginians (5th to 3rd centuries). The close of the millennium sees the rise of the Roman Empire. The early Celtic culture dominate Central Europe while Northern Europe is in the Pre-Roman Iron Age. In East Africa, the Nubian Empire and Aksum arise.

In South Asia, the Vedic civilization gives rise to the Maurya Empire. The Scythians dominate Central Asia. In China, the Zhou dynasty rules the Chinese heartland at the beginning of the millennium. The decline of the Zhou dynasty during Spring and Autumn period and the Warring States period sees the rise of such philosophical and spiritual traditions as Confucianism and Taoism. Towards the close of the millennium, the Han dynasty extends Chinese power towards Central Asia, where it borders on Indo-Greek and Iranian states. Japan is in the Yayoi period.

The Olmec civilization declines, and the Maya and Zapotec civilizations emerge in Mesoamerica. The Chavín culture flourishes in Peru.

The first millennium BC is the formative period of the classical world religions, with the development of early Judaism and Zoroastrianism in the Near East, and Vedic religion and Vedanta, Jainism and Buddhism in India. Early literature develops in Greek, Latin, Hebrew, Sanskrit, Tamil and Chinese. The term Axial Age, coined by Karl Jaspers, is intended to express the crucial importance of the period of c. the 8th to 2nd centuries BC in world history.

World population more than doubled over the course of the millennium, from about an estimated 50–100 million to an estimated 170–300 million. Close to 90% of world population at the end of the first millennium BC lived in the Iron Age civilizations of the Old World (Roman Empire, Parthian Empire, Graeco-Indo-Scythian and Hindu kingdoms, Han China). The population of the Americas was below 20 million, concentrated in Mesoamerica (Epi-Olmec culture); that of Sub-Saharan Africa was likely below 10 million. The population of Oceania was likely less than one million people.

== Ancient history ==
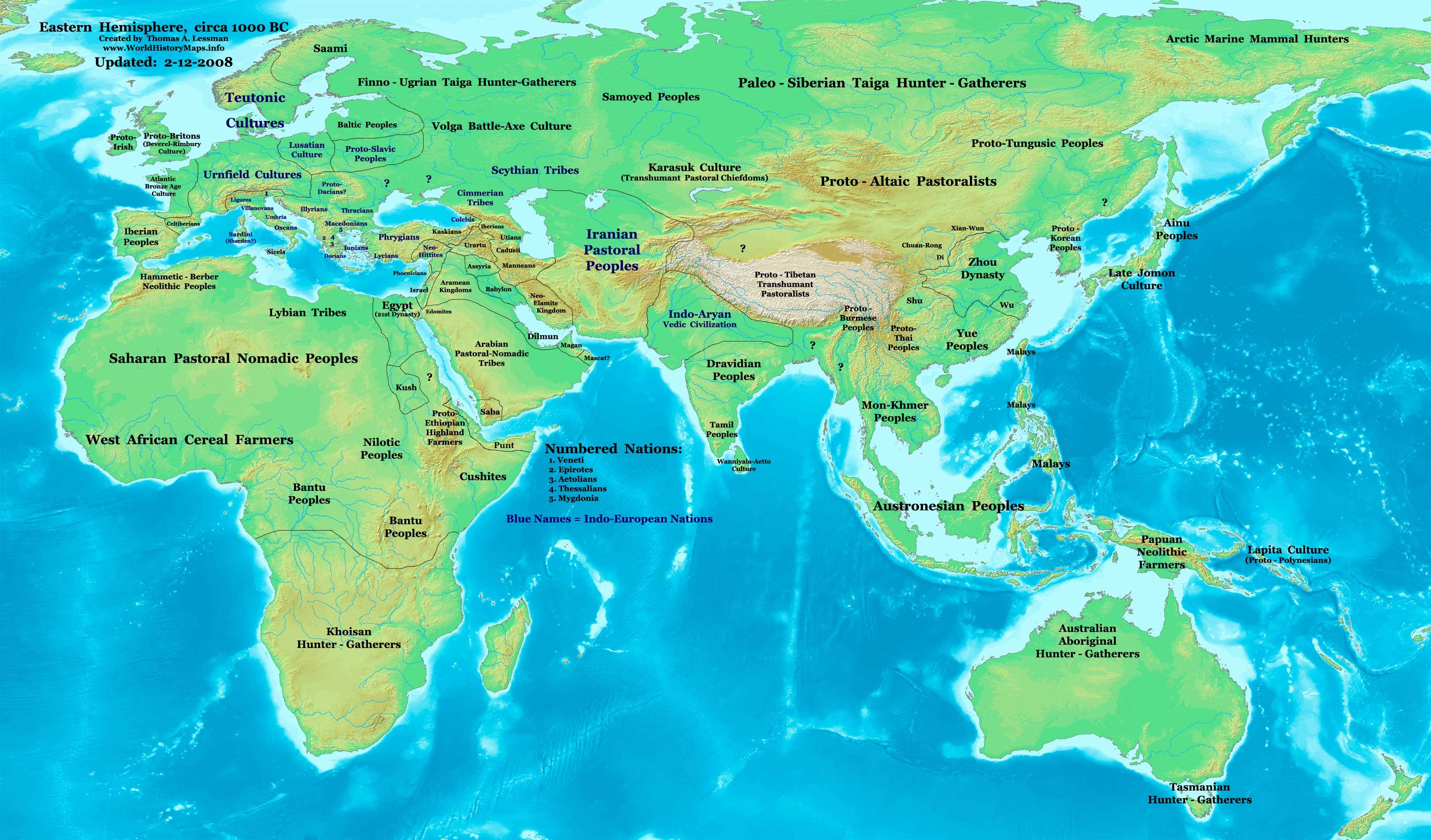
Map of the Eastern Hemisphere in 1000 BC.

=== Timeline ===
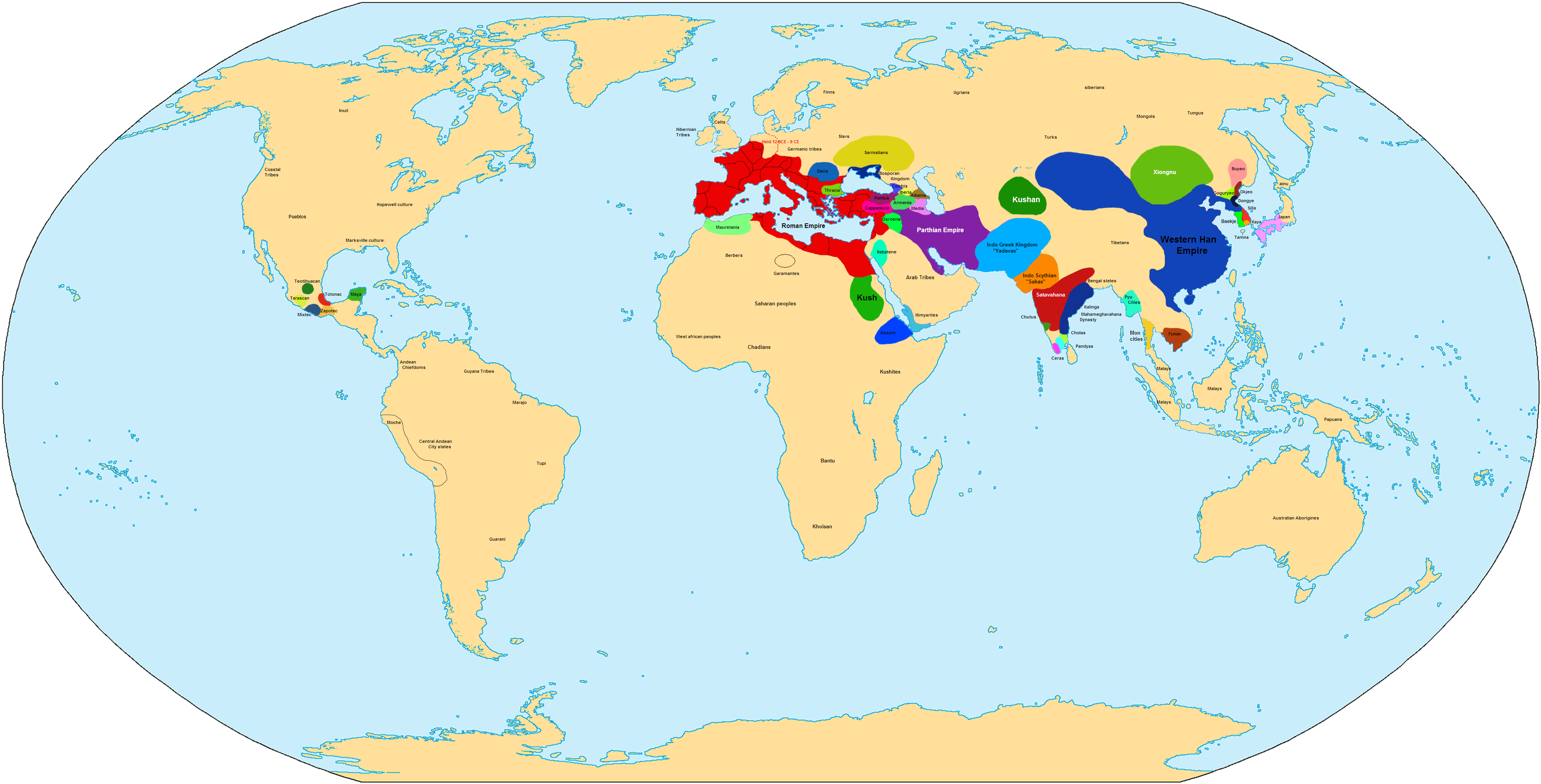
Map of the world in 1 AD, just after the end of the 1st millennium BC.

- 10th century BC
  - Near East: Neo-Assyrian Empire
  - Near East: Shoshenq I invades Canaan
  - Aegean: Helladic period ends
  - Sub-Saharan Africa West: Nok Culture slowly diffuse discernible ceramic sculpting, iron metallurgy and cereal farming cultures through the inland Niger Delta region, though debatable possible settling period and or foundation of proto Ile-Ife
- 9th century BC
  - Chavín culture in Peru
  - Egypt: 872 BC: Nile floods the Temple of Luxor
  - Egypt: 836 BC: Civil war in Egypt
  - South Asia: 872 BC: Jainism re-organized by Parshvanatha
  - North Africa: 814 BC: Carthage founded
  - China: 841 BC–828 BC Gonghe Regency
- 8th century BC
  - 727 BC: Egypt: Kushite invasion (25th Dynasty)
  - 771 BC: China: Spring and Autumn period
  - Near East: 727 BC: Death of Tiglath-Pileser III, Babylonia secedes from Assyria
  - Near East: 722 BC: Sargon II takes Samaria; Assyrian captivity of the Israelites.
  - Greece: Archaic Greece, Greek alphabet
  - Greece: Homer
  - 776 BC: Greece: First Olympiad
  - 753 BC: Europe: foundation of Rome
- 7th century BC
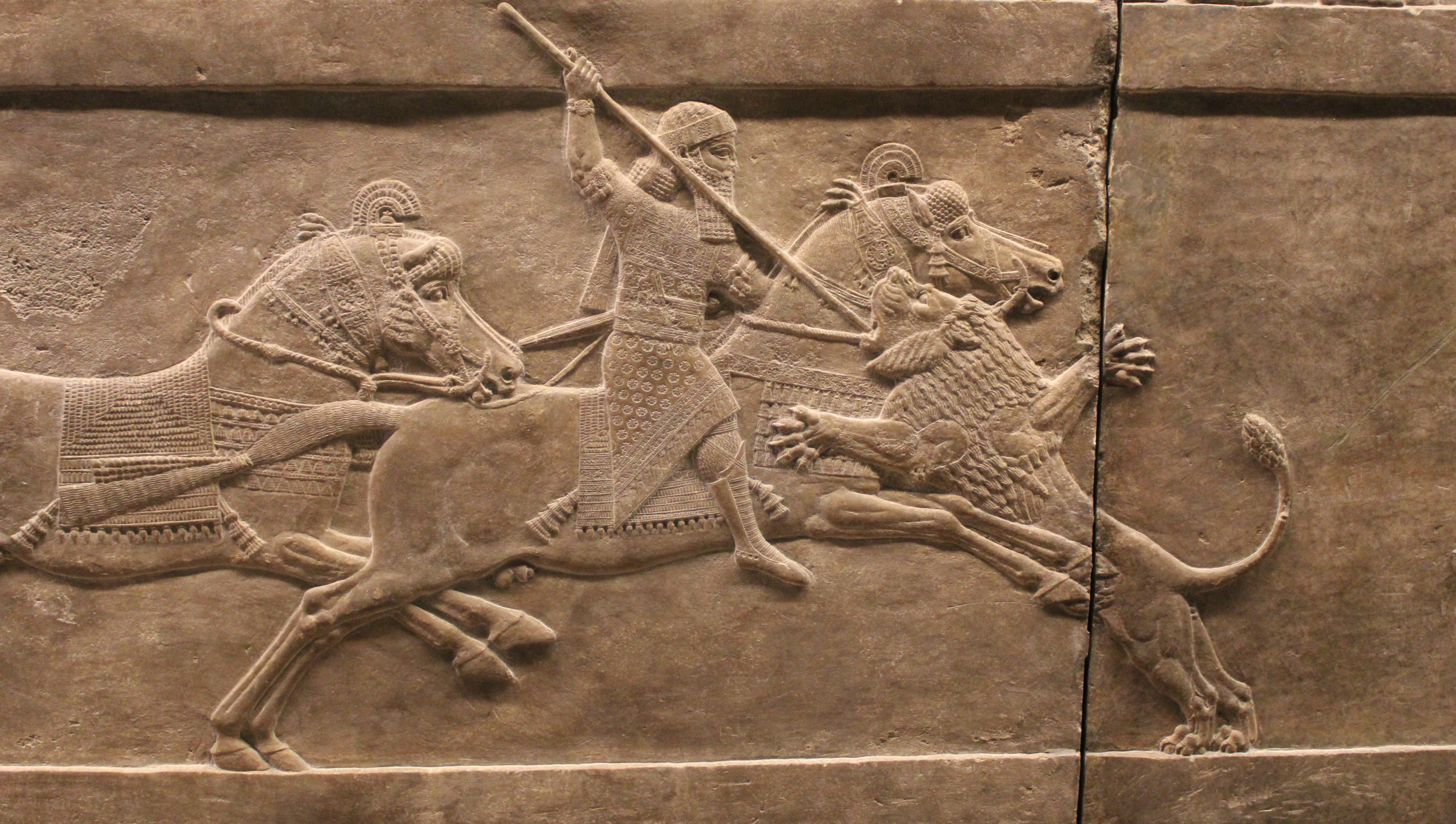
  Relief of King Ashurbanipal of Assyria hunting a Mesopotamian lion, from the Northern Palace in Nineveh, c. 645-635 BC
  - Egypt:
    - 671 BC: Assyrian conquest of Egypt
    - 656 BC: Egypt gains independence from Assyrian rule, Psamtik I was firmly in control of all Egypt
    - 655 BC: Fall of Ashdod: Egyptian forces conquers Ashdod
    - 609 BC: The Judaean forces battles the Egyptian army at Battle of Meggido, resulting in Josiah's death in the battle and his kingdom becoming a vassal state of Egypt
  - Near East: 631 BC: Death of Ashurbanipal, decline of the Assyrian Empire
- 6th century BC
  - Egypt: 592 BC: Psamtik II sacks Napata
  - Sudan: Aspelta moves the Kushite capital to Meroe
  - Near East: 539 BC: Achaemenid conquest of Babylon under Cyrus the Great
  - South Asia: Śramaṇa movement and "second urbanisation"
  - South Asia: Early Buddhism
  - Europe: 509 BC: Roman Republic
- 5th century BC
  - China: 479 BC: death of Confucius
  - China: 476 BC: Warring States period
  - China: 486 BC: Grand Canal construction begins
  - Near East: Second Temple Judaism, redaction of the Hebrew Bible
  - Greece: beginning of the classical period (Greece in the 5th century BC).
  - Greece: Greco-Persian Wars (Battle of Marathon, Battle of Thermopylae)
  - Greece: 440 BC: Herodotus' Histories
  - Greece: 431 BC: Peloponnesian War
  - Oceania: Austronesian expansion reaches Western Polynesia
  - Egypt: 404 BC: Egypt gains its full independence and sovereignty, Amyrtaeus becomes pharaoh
- 4th century BC
  - Greece: 395 BC: Corinthian War
  - Egypt:
    - 343 BC: Achaemenid conquest
    - 338 BC: Egypt gains independence from Persian rule

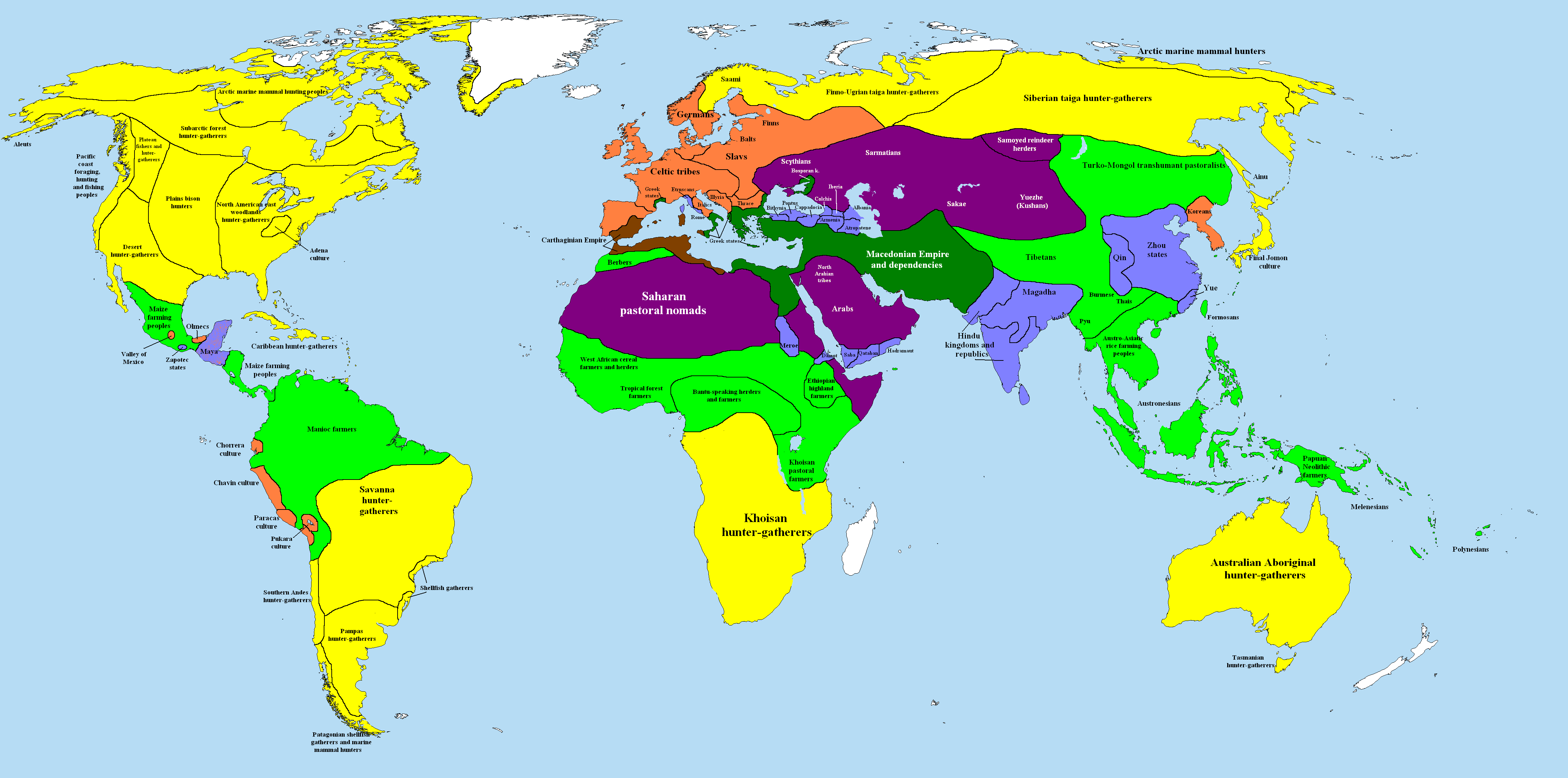
Map of the world in 323 BC

  - Greece/Asia/Egypt: 330s BC: conquests of Alexander the Great, end of the Achaemenid Empire, Macedonian Empire, beginning of the Hellenistic period
  - South Asia: Mauryan Empire
- 3rd century BC
  - China: Qin Unified China
  - China: 206 BC: Han dynasty
  - South Asia: 261 BC: Kalinga war
  - Egypt: 206 BC: The Great Theban Revolt, Horwennefer proclaimed pharaoh over Upper Egypt
  - Rome: Roman expansion in Italy
  - Rome/Carthage: Punic Wars
    - 264 BC: First Punic War
    - 218 BC Second Punic War
- 2nd century BC
  - Rome/Carthage: 149 BC Third Punic War, Roman province of Africa
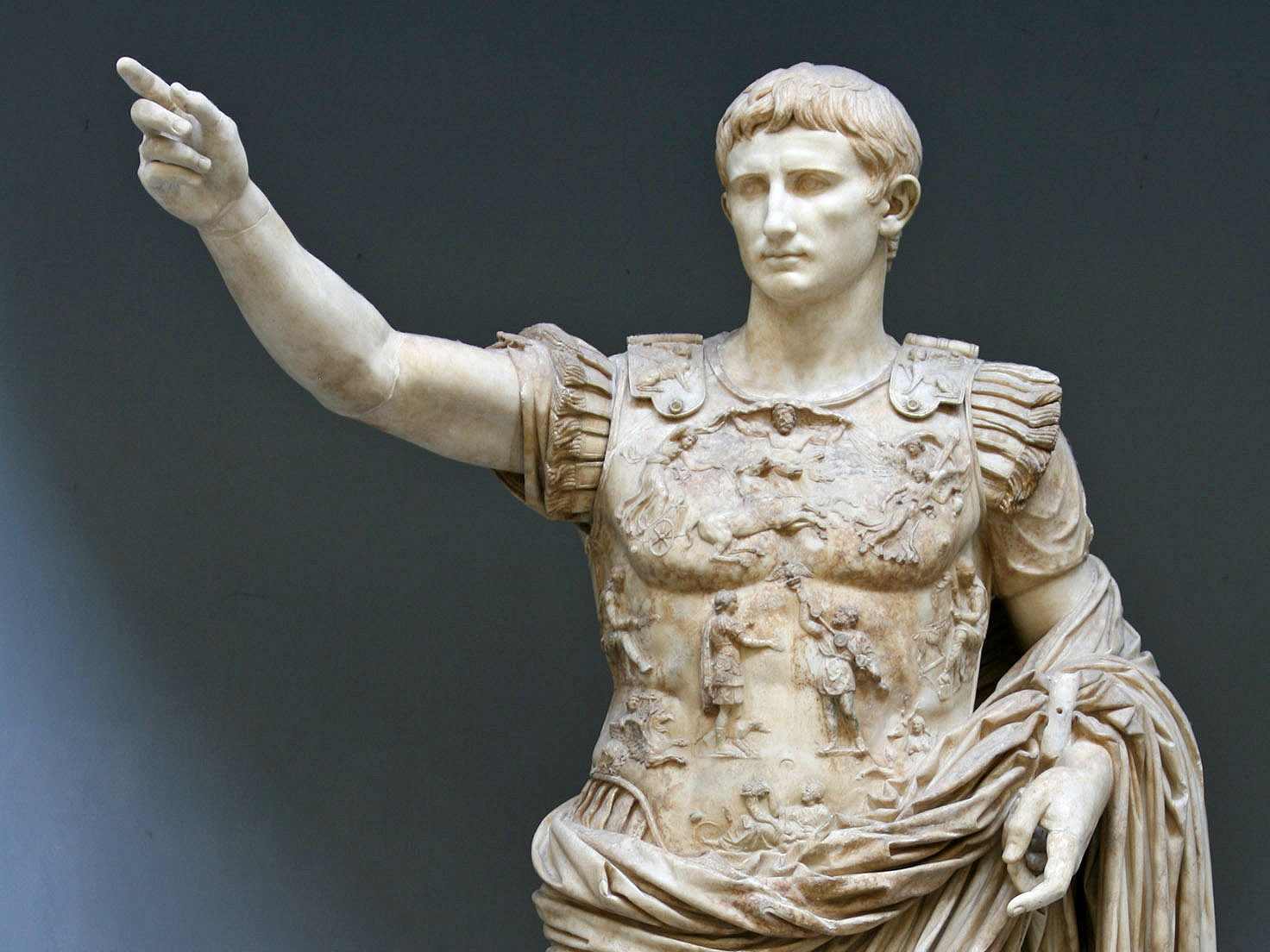
    Augustus Caesar, the first emperor of the Roman Empire
  - Rome/Greece: 146 BC Battle of Corinth, beginning of the Roman era
  - South Asia: 185 BC: Fall of the Maurya Empire
  - Egypt:
    - 199 BC: Ankhwennefer succeeds Horwennefer as pharaoh over Upper Egypt
    - 131 BC: Capture of Thebes, Egyptian leader Harsiesi seized Thebes in the summer of 131 BC, proclaimed pharaoh, for a short period of time
  - China: Confucianism became the state ideology of China
- 1st century BC
  - China: 91 BC: Records of the Grand Historian finished
  - Rome/Europe: 58–50 BC Gallic Wars
  - Rome: 32/30 BC: Final War of the Roman Republic (Battle of Actium)
  - Rome/Egypt: 31 BC: Roman conquest of Egypt
  - Rome/Europe/West Asia/Africa: 27 BC: Roman Empire
    - 30/29 BC: The Revolt of Thebes erupt in Egypt against Roman rule

=== Inventions, discoveries, introductions ===
Scythian gold plaque with panther (late 7th century BC)

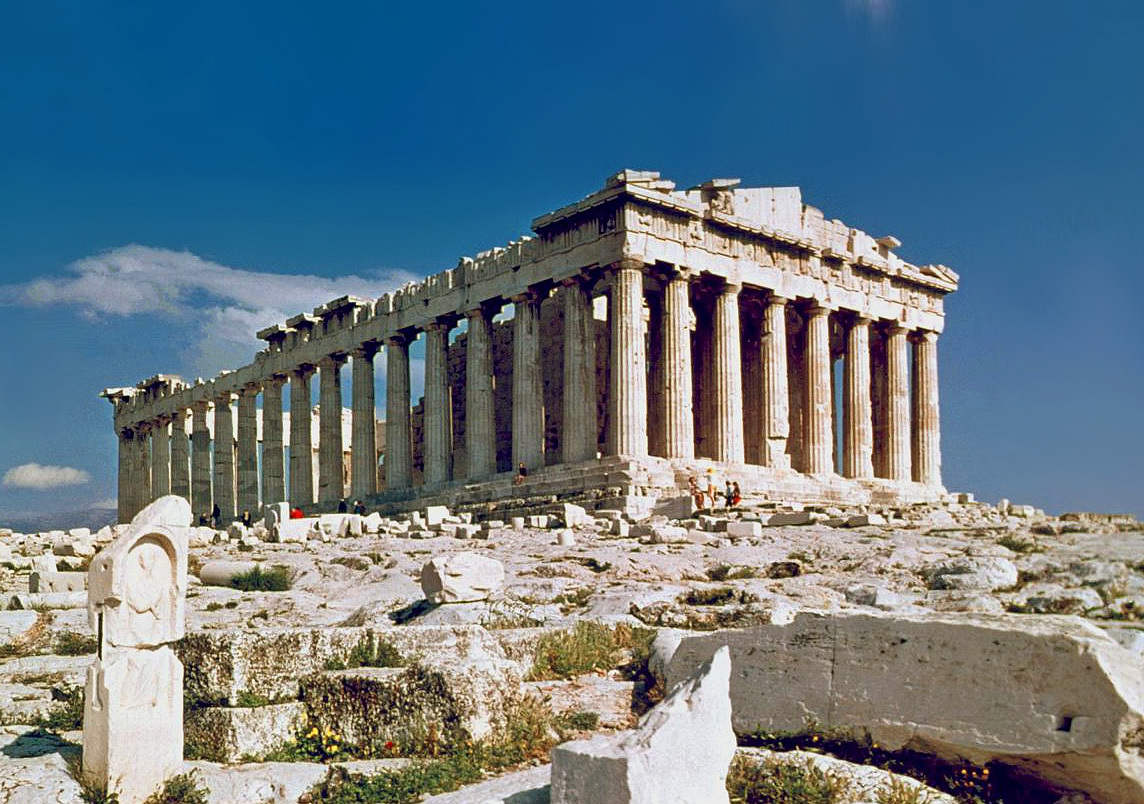
The Parthenon, Athens (5th century BC)

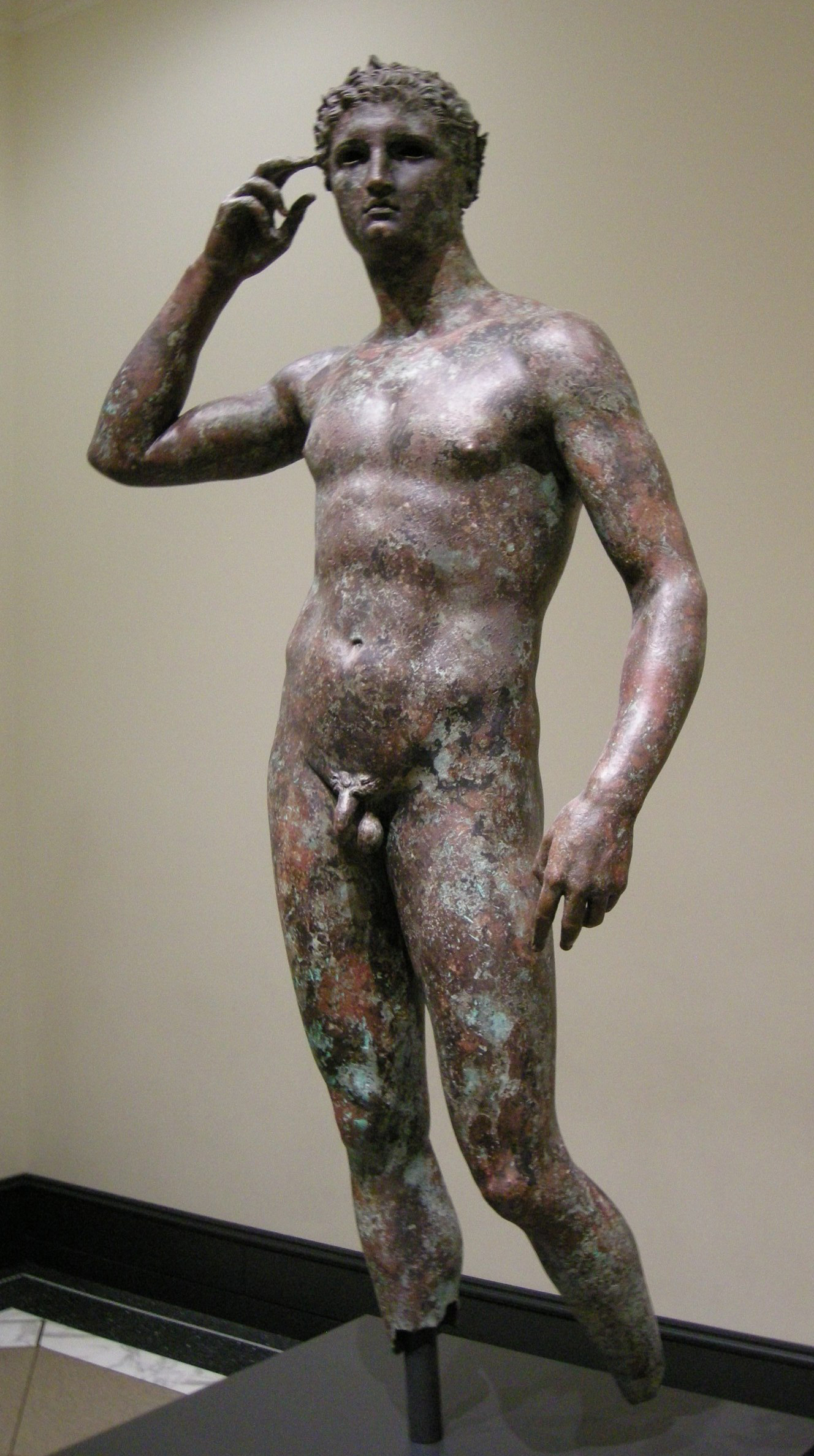
The Victorious Youth (c. 310 BC), a preserved bronze statue of a Greek athlete in Contrapposto pose

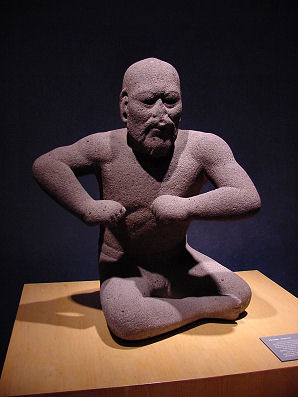
"The Wrestler", an Olmec era statuette, dated roughly 1400–400 BC

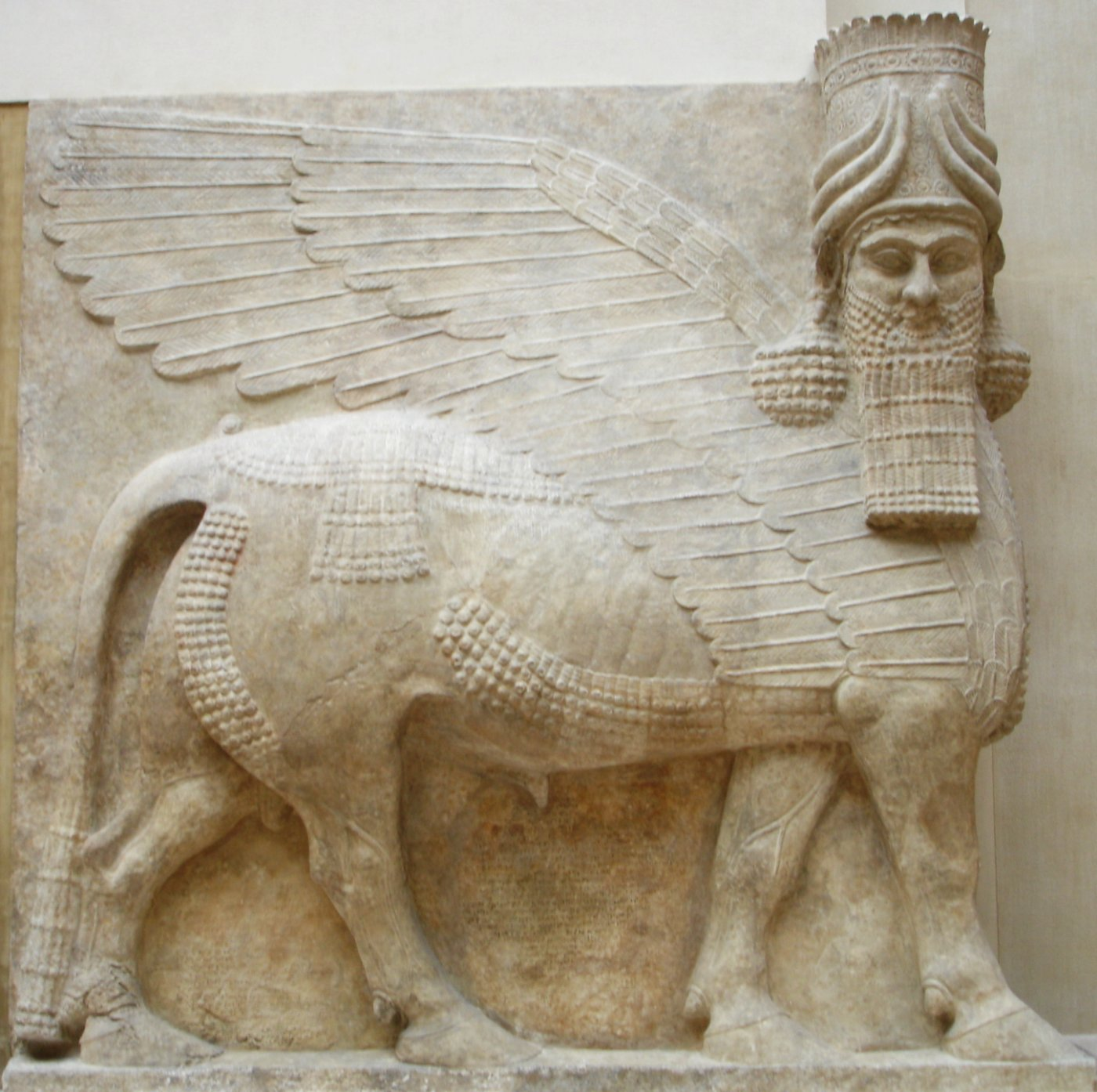
Lamassu facing forward. Bas-relief from the king Sargon II's palace at Dur Sharrukin in Assyria (now Khorsabad in Iraq), c. 713–716 BC. From Paul-Émile Botta's excavations in 1843–1844.

- 8th century BC
  - Greek alphabet, the first alphabet with vowels.
- 7th century BC
  - Trireme
- 6th century BC
  - Paved trackway
  - Pythagorean theorem
  - Monotheism
- 5th century BC
  - Blast furnace China
  - Atomism
  - Crossbow
  - Siege engine
- 4th century BC
  - formal grammar
  - Kyrenia ship
- 3rd century BC
  - Lighthouse of Alexandria
  - Malleable Cast iron China
  - Archimedes' principle
  - Spherical Earth
  - Water clock
  - Qin built and unified various sections of the Great Wall of China.
  - Qin built Qin Shi Huang's Mausoleum guarded by the life-sized Terracotta Army.
- 2nd century BC
  - Antikythera mechanism

=== Literature ===
Greco-Roman literature

Archaic period

- Homer (late 8th or early 7th c.), Iliad, Odyssey
- Hesiod (8th to 7th c.), Theogony and Works and Days
- Archilochus (7th century), Greek poet
- Sappho, (late 7th to early 6th c.), Greek poet
- Ibycus
- Alcaeus of Mytilene
- Aesop's Fables

Classical period

- Aeschylus (c. 525–455 BC), Greek playwright
- Herodotus (484–425 BC), Histories
- Euripides (c. 480–406 BC), Greek playwright
- Xenophon: Anabasis, Cyropaedia
- Aristotle (384–322 BC), corpus Aristotelicum

Hellenistic to Roman period

- Septuagint
- Apollonius of Rhodes: Argonautica
- Callimachus (310/305-240 B.C.), lyric poet
- Manetho: Aegyptiaca
- Theocritus, lyric poet
- Euclid: Elements
- Menander: Dyskolos
- Theophrastus: Enquiry into Plants
- Old Latin Livius Andronicus, Gnaeus Naevius, Plautus, Quintus Fabius Pictor, Lucius Cincius Alimentus
- Classical Latin: Cicero, Julius Caesar, Virgil, Lucretius, Livy, Catullus

Chinese literature

- I Ching (date unknown, between the 10th and 4th centuries BC)
- Classic of Poetry (Shījīng), Classic of Documents (Shūjīng) (authentic portions), Classic of Changes (I Ching)
- Spring and Autumn Annals (Chūnqiū) (722–481 BC, chronicles of the state of Lu)
- Confucius: Analects (Lúnyǔ)
- Classic of Rites (Lǐjì)
- Commentaries of Zuo (Zuǒzhuàn)
- Laozi (or Lao Tzu): Tao Te Ching
- Zhuangzi: Zhuangzi (book)
- Mencius: Mencius

Sanskrit literature

- Vedic Sanskrit: Vedas, Brahmanas
- Vedanga
- Mukhya Upanishads
- Early layers of the Sanskrit epics (c. 3rd century BC to 4th century AD)

Hebrew

- c. 8th to 7th c.: the Book of Nahum, Book of Hosea, Book of Amos, Book of Isaiah
- c. 6th c.: Psalms
- c. 5th century: redaction of the Torah
- 3rd century: Ecclesiastes
- 2nd century: Book of Wisdom

Avestan

- Yasht, Avesta, Vendidad

Other (2nd to 1st century BC)

- Pali literature: Tipitaka
- Tamil:Sangam literature
- Aramaic: Book of Daniel

== Archaeology ==
Culture	Region	Period	Notes
Urnfield culture	Europe, Central	1300–750 BC	Bronze Age Europe
Atlantic Bronze Age	Europe, Western	1300–700 BC	Bronze Age Europe
Painted Grey Ware culture	South Asia	1200–600 BC	Bronze Age India, Indo-Aryan migration
Late Nordic Bronze Age	Europe, North	1100–550 BC	Bronze Age Europe
Villanovan culture	Europe, Italy	1100–700 BC	Iron Age Europe
Greek Dark Ages	Greece	1100–800 BC	Dorian invasion
Iron Age II	Near East	1000–586 BC	Ancient Near East, List of archaeological periods (Levant)
Sa Huỳnh culture	Southeast Asia, Vietnam	1000 BC–AD 200	
Woodland period	North America	1000 BC – AD 1000	List of archaeological periods (North America)
Bantu expansion	Sub-Saharan Africa	1000 BC–AD 500	
Middle Nok Period	Sub-Saharan Africa, West	900–300 BC	Iron metallurgy in Africa
Novocherkassk culture	Europe, Eastern	900–650 BC	
Chavín de Huántar	South America, Peru	1200–500 BC	
Poverty Point earthworks	North America, Louisiana	1650–700 BC	
Olmecs	Mesoamerica	1500–400 BC	
Adena culture	North America, Ohio	1000–200 BC	
Liaoning bronze dagger culture	East Asia	800–600 BC	
Middle Mumun	East Asia, Korea	800–300 BC	
Etruscan civilization	Europe, Italy	800–264 BC	
Paracas culture	South America, Peru	800–100 BC	
Hallstatt culture	Europe, Central	800 BC–500 BC	Iron Age Europe, Thraco-Cimmerian, Celts
British Iron Age	Europe, Britain	700–50 BC	Insular Celts
Zapotec civilization	Mesoamerica	700 BC – AD 700	
Pazyryk culture	Central Asia	600–300 BC	Scythians, Saka, Pazyryk burials
Aldy-Bel culture	Central Asia	600–300 BC	Scythians, Saka
La Tène culture	Europe, Central/Western	500–50 BC	Gauls
Pre-Roman Iron Age	Europe, North	500–50 BC	Proto-Germanic
Northern Black Polished Ware	South Asia	500–300 BC	Vedic period
Late Mumun	East Asia, Korea	550–300 BC	
Urewe	Sub-Saharan Africa	400 BC–AD 500	Iron metallurgy in Africa
Late Nok Period	Sub-Saharan Africa, West	300–1 BC	Iron metallurgy in Africa
Nasca culture	South America, Peru	100 BC–800 AD	
Calima culture	South America, Colombia	200 BC–400 AD	
Hopewell tradition	North America	100 BC–AD 400	
Teotihuacan	Mesoamerica	100 BC –AD 550	
Ipiutak site	North America, Alaska	100 BC –AD 800	

== Astronomy ==
Historical solar eclipses

Year (BC)	Date	Eclipse Type	Saros Series	Eclipse Magnitude	Gamma	Ecliptic Conjunction (UT)	Greatest Eclipse (UT)	Duration (Min & Sec)	Description
899	21 Apr	Annular	53	0.9591	0.8964	22:32:15	22:21:56	00:03:04	China's 'Double-Dawn' Eclipse
763	15 Jun	Total	44	1.0596	0.2715	08:11:13	08:14:01	00:05:00	Assyrian Eclipse
648	6 Apr	Total	38	1.0689	0.6898	08:24:05	08:31:03	00:05:02	Archilochus' Eclipse
585	28 May	Total	57	1.0798	0.3201	14:25:41	14:22:26	00:06:04	Thales Eclipse (Medes vs. Lydians), firstly recorded in Herodotus History.
557	19 May	Total	48	1.0258	0.3145	12:49:02	12:52:26	00:02:22	The Siege of Larisa, firstly recorded by Xenophon.
480	2 Oct	Annular	65	0.9324	0.4951	11:56:54	11:51:01	00:07:57	Xerxes' Eclipse. recorded by Herodotus History.
431	3 Aug	Annular	48	0.9843	0.8388	14:45:34	14:54:52	00:01:05	Peloponnesian War.
424	21 Mar	Annular	42	0.9430	0.9433	07:43:30	07:54:29	00:04:39	8th Year of Peloponnesian War.

== Centuries and decades ==
10th century BC	990s BC	980s BC	970s BC	960s BC	950s BC	940s BC	930s BC	920s BC	910s BC	900s BC
9th century BC	890s BC	880s BC	870s BC	860s BC	850s BC	840s BC	830s BC	820s BC	810s BC	800s BC
8th century BC	790s BC	780s BC	770s BC	760s BC	750s BC	740s BC	730s BC	720s BC	710s BC	700s BC
7th century BC	690s BC	680s BC	670s BC	660s BC	650s BC	640s BC	630s BC	620s BC	610s BC	600s BC
6th century BC	590s BC	580s BC	570s BC	560s BC	550s BC	540s BC	530s BC	520s BC	510s BC	500s BC
5th century BC	490s BC	480s BC	470s BC	460s BC	450s BC	440s BC	430s BC	420s BC	410s BC	400s BC
4th century BC	390s BC	380s BC	370s BC	360s BC	350s BC	340s BC	330s BC	320s BC	310s BC	300s BC
3rd century BC	290s BC	280s BC	270s BC	260s BC	250s BC	240s BC	230s BC	220s BC	210s BC	200s BC
2nd century BC	190s BC	180s BC	170s BC	160s BC	150s BC	140s BC	130s BC	120s BC	110s BC	100s BC
1st century BC	90s BC	80s BC	70s BC	60s BC	50s BC	40s BC	30s BC	20s BC	10s BC	0s BC
