= 10th century BC =

One hundred years, from 1000 BC to 901 BC

The 10th century BC comprises the years from 1000 BC to 901 BC. This period followed the Late Bronze Age collapse in the Near East, and the century saw the Early Iron Age take hold there. The Greek Dark Ages which had come about in 1200 BC continued. The Neo-Assyrian Empire is established towards the end of the 10th century BC. In the Iron Age in India, the Vedic period is ongoing. In China, the Zhou dynasty is in power. Bronze Age Europe continued with Urnfield culture. Japan was inhabited by an evolving hunter-gatherer society during the Jōmon period.

== The world in the 10th century BC ==
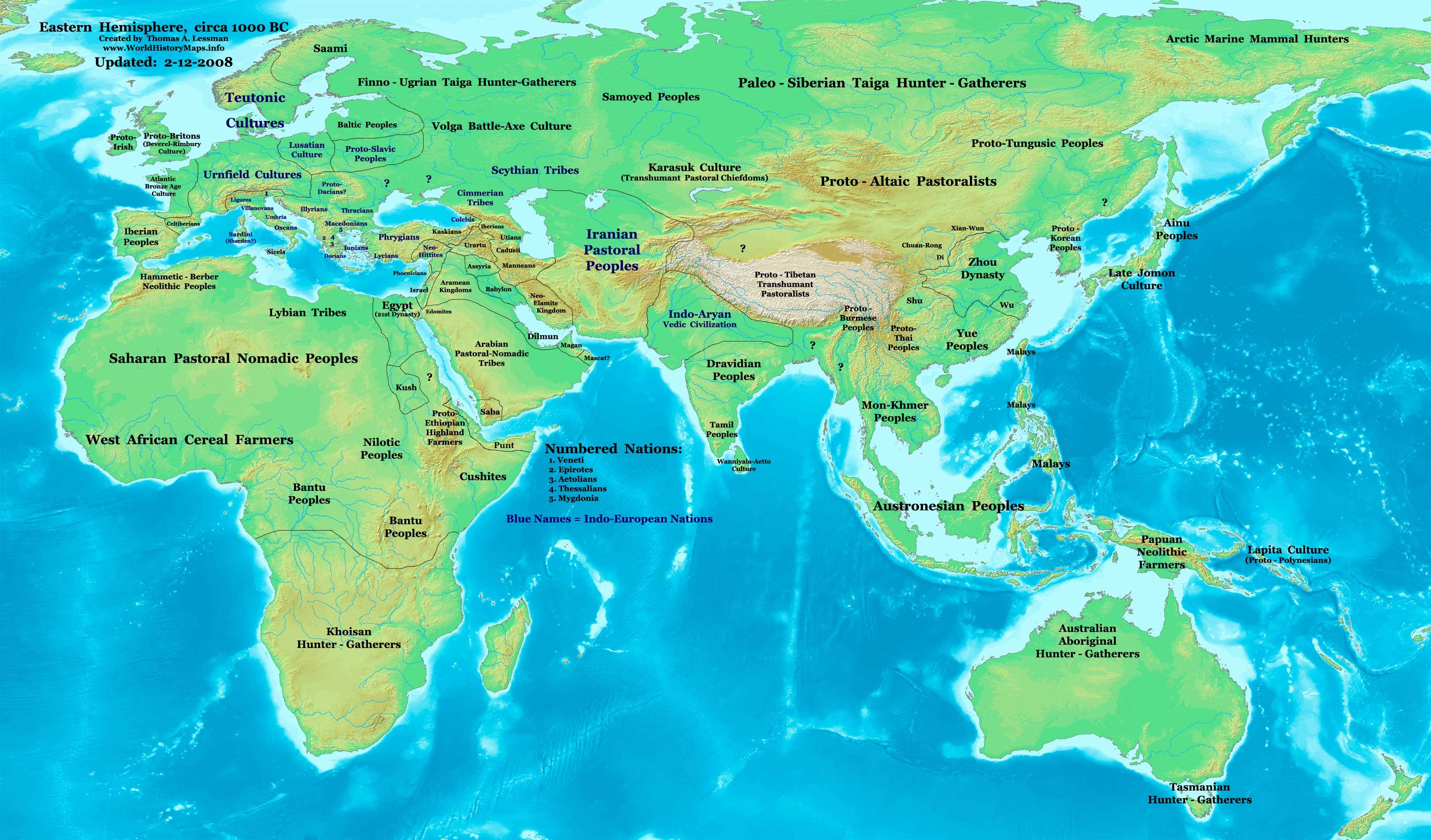
Map of the Eastern Hemisphere in 1000 BC.

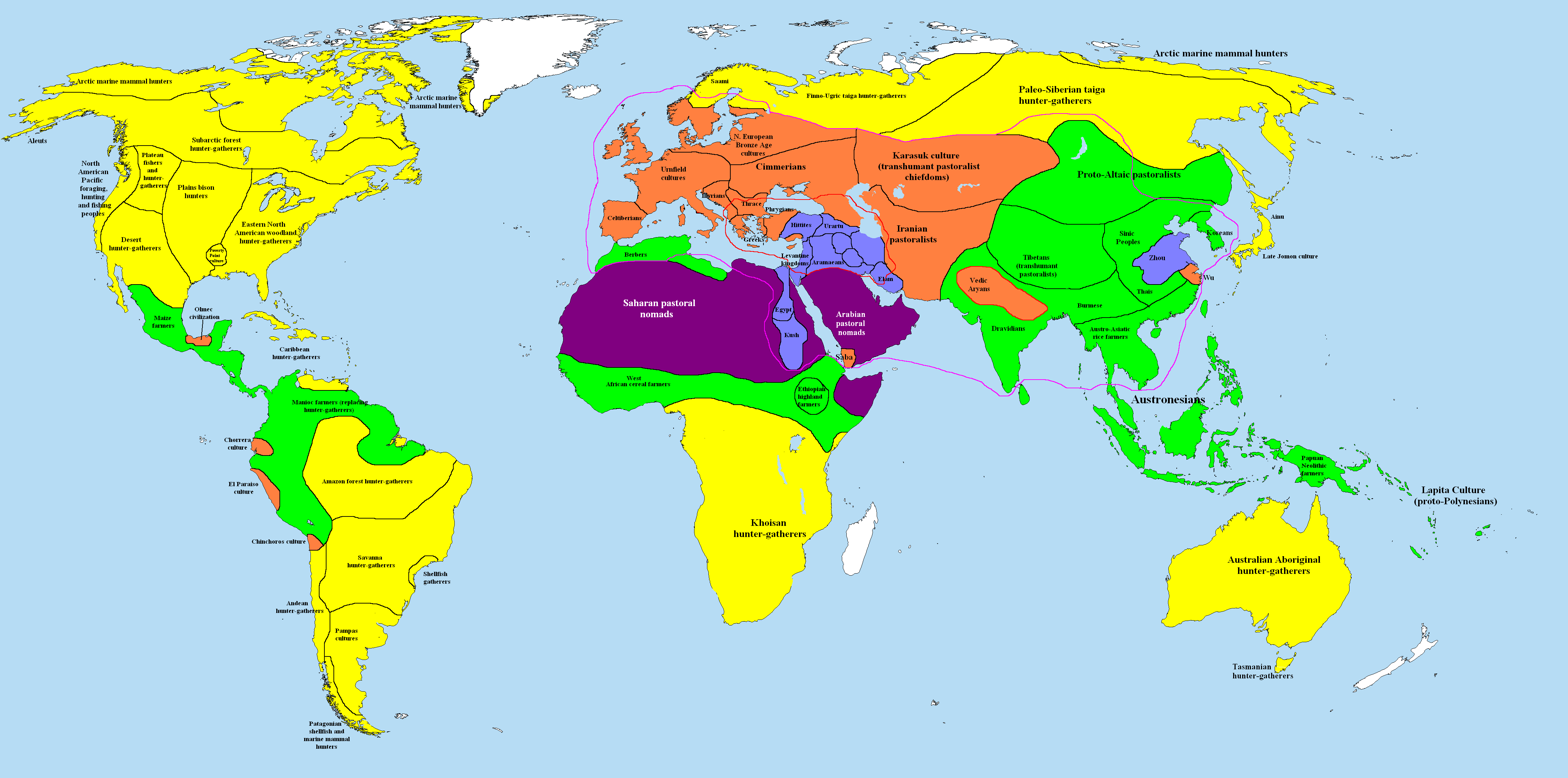
The world in 1000 BCE.

== Events ==
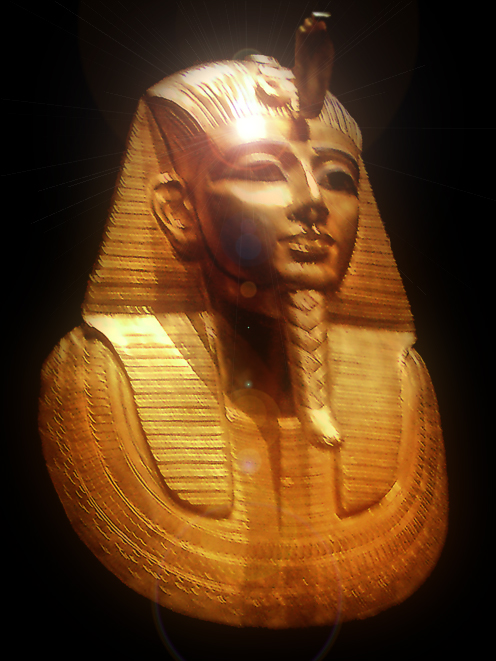
Gold burial mask of Pharaoh Psusennes I, discovered 1940 by Pierre Montet.

- 1000 BC: India—Iron Age of India. Indian kingdoms rule India—Panchala, Kuru, Kosala, Pandya and Videha.
- c. 1000 BC: The Sa Huỳnh culture started in central and southern Vietnam.
- 993 BC: Amenemope succeeds Psusennes I as king of Egypt.
- 993 BC: Archippus, King of Athens dies after a reign of 19 years and is succeeded by his son Thersippus.
- 984 BC: Osorkon the Elder succeeds Amenemope as king of Egypt.
- 982 BC: The end of first period (1197 BC—982 BC) by Sau Yung's concept of the I Ching and history.
- 978 BC: Siamun succeeds Osorkon the Elder as king of Egypt.
- 967 BC: Tiglath-Pileser II becomes King of Assyria.
- 965 BC: David, king of the United Monarchy, dies.
- 962 BC: Solomon becomes king of Israel, following the death of his father, King David. (traditional date)
- 959 BC: Psusennes II succeeds Siamun as king of Egypt.
- 957 BC: Solomon completes the construction of the First Temple in Jerusalem.
- c. 953 BC: Alternative date to the founding of Rome.
- 952 BC: Thersippus, King of Athens dies after a reign of 41 years and is succeeded by his son Phorbas.
- 947 BC: Death of King Mo of Zhou, king of the Zhou dynasty of China.
- 946 BC: King Gong of Zhou becomes king of the Zhou dynasty of China.
- 945/943 BC: Egypt: Psusennes II dies, the last pharaoh of the Twenty-first Dynasty. Shoshenq I succeeds him, and founds the Twenty-second Dynasty.
- 935 BC: Death of King Gong of Zhou, king of the Zhou dynasty of China.
- 935 BC: Death of Tiglath-Pileser II king of Assyria.
- 931 BC: Solomon, king of the ancient Israelites, dies.
- c. 925 BC: Partition of ancient Israel into the Kingdoms of Judah and Israel.
- c. 922 BC: Osorkon I succeeds his father Shoshenq I as king of Egypt.
- 922 BC: Phorbas, King of Athens, dies after a reign of 30 years and is succeeded by his son Megacles.
- 912 BC: Adad-nirari II succeeds his father Ashur-Dan II as king of Assyria.
- 911 BC: Abijah, king of Judah, dies.
- 909 BC: Jeroboam, the first king of the northern Hebrew kingdom of Israel, dies and is succeeded by his son Nadab.
- c. 900 BC: the Villanovan culture emerges in northern Italy.
- c. 900 BC: Foundation of Anuradhapura, Sri Lanka.
- c. 900 BC: the Adichanallur relics, from Tamil Nadu Culture, India came from this era
- 900 BC: Kingdom of Kush.

Late 10th century BC:

- Centaur, from Lefkandi, Euboea is made. It is now at the Archaeological Museum of Eretria in Greece.
- Foundation of Sparta.
- The kingdom of Ethiopia is founded by Menelik I, who according to legend was the son of Solomon and the Queen of Sheba.
- First extant evidence of written Aramaic language.
- The earliest known settlement in Plymouth, England dates back to this era.
- Creation of ceremonial golden hats in Central Europe.

== Sovereign states ==
See: List of sovereign states in the 10th century BC.
