= 470s BC =

Decade

This article concerns the period 479 BC – 470 BC.

== Events ==
=== 479 BC ===
==== By place ====
====== Greece ======
- The Persian commander Mardonius, now based in Thessaly, wins support from Argus and western Arcadia. He tries to win over Athens, but fails.
- Mardonius attacks Athens once more and the Athenians are forced to retreat, whereupon he razes the city. The Spartans march north to support Athens against the Persians.
- August 27
  - The Battle of Plataea in Boeotia ends the Persian invasions of Greece as the Persian general Mardonius is routed by the Greeks under Pausanias, nephew of the former Spartan King, Leonidas I. The Athenian contingent is led by the repatriated Aristides. Mardonius is killed in the battle and the Greeks capture enormous amounts of loot. Thebes is captured shortly thereafter and the Theban collaborators executed by Pausanias.
  - Meanwhile at sea, the Persians are defeated by a Greek fleet headed by Leotychidas of Sparta and Xanthippus of Athens in the Battle of Mycale, on the coast of Ionia in Asia Minor.
- Potidaea is struck by a tsunami.

=== 478 BC ===
==== By place ====
====== Greece ======
- Despite Spartan opposition, Athens works on refortifying and rebuilding after the Persian destruction of the city in 479.
- The Delian League is established
- With the help of the Athenian statesman and general, Cimon, Aristides commands an Athenian fleet of 30 ships that the Spartan commander Pausanias leads to capture the Greek cities on Cyprus and Byzantium, taking them from the Persians and their Phoenician allies.
- While Pausanias is occupying Byzantium, his arrogance and his adoption of Persian clothing and manners offends the allies and raises suspicions of disloyalty. Pausanias is recalled to Sparta, where he is tried and acquitted of the charge of treason, but he is not restored to his command.

====== Sicily ======
- Hiero I (Hieron) becomes the Tyrant of Syracuse following the death of his brother Gelo.

====== China ======
- A Temple of Confucius is established in (modern-day) Qufu.

=== 477 BC ===
==== By place ====
====== Greece ======
- The Spartan co-ruler Leotychides and the Athenian leader Themistocles lead a fleet and army to reoccupy northern Greece and to punish the aristocratic family of the Aleuads for having aided the Persians. Leotychides is caught accepting a bribe during the operations in Thessaly.
- Greek maritime cities around the Aegean Sea no longer wish to be under Spartan control and at Delos offer their allegiance, through Aristides, to Athens. They form the Delian League (also known as the Confederacy of Delos) with Cimon as their principal commander.

====== Roman Republic ======
- Roman forces in a stronghold on the Cremera River are defeated by an army of Veientes from the Etruscan city of Veii in the Battle of the Cremera.

=== 476 BC ===
==== By place ====
====== Greece ======
- Convicted in Sparta on the charge of accepting a bribe from the Aleudae family whilst leading an expedition to Thessaly against the family for their collaboration with the Persians, the Spartan King Leotychidas flees to the temple of Athena Alea in Tegea, Arcadia. A sentence of exile is passed upon him; his house is razed, and his grandson, Archidamus II, ascends the Spartan throne in his place.
- Cimon of Athens increases his power at the expense of Themistocles. He ousts Pausanias and the Spartans from the area around the Bosporus. The Spartans, hearing that Pausanias is intriguing with the Persians, recall him and he is "disciplined".
- Under the leadership of Kimon, the Delian League continues to fight Persia and to remove the Ionian cities from Persian administration. The conquest of Eion on the Strymon from Persia is led by Cimon.

==== By topic ====
====== Literature ======
- The Greek poet Pindar visits Sicily and is made welcome at the courts of Theron of Acragas and Hieron I of Syracuse. They commission some of his greatest poetry. It is through these connections that Pindar's reputation spreads all over the Greek world.

=== 475 BC ===
==== By place ====
====== Greece ======
- Cimon leads an Athenian attack on the island of Skyros and expels the indigenous inhabitants who are regarded as pirates.
- The first recorded eruption of Mount Etna occurs.

====== China ======
- Zhou Yuan Wang becomes king of the Zhou dynasty.

==== By topic ====
====== Arts ======
- The painter Polygnotus of Thasos begins his work (approximate date).

=== 474 BC ===
==== By place ====
====== Italy ======
- Hiero I, tyrant of Syracuse, allied with naval forces from the maritime Greek cities of southern Italy defeats the Etruscan navy in the Battle of Cumae as the Etruscans try to capture the Greek city of Cumae. This victory marks the end of the Etruscan aggression against the Greeks in southern Italy and saves the Greeks of Campania from Etruscan domination.
- Taras signs an alliance with Rhegion, to counter the Messapians, Peucetians, and Lucanians, but the joint armies of the Tarentines and Rhegines are defeated near Kailia.
- Hiero builds Castello Aragonese on the island of Ischia.
- Consuls: Lucius Lucius Furius Medullinus and Gnaeus Manlius Vulso

==== By topic ====
====== Literature ======
- The Greek poet Pindar moves to Thebes after two years at the Sicilian Court of Hiero I of Syracuse. While at Thebes, he composes lyric odes to celebrate triumphs in the Olympic Games and other athletic events.

=== 473 BC ===
==== By place ====
====== China ======
- The State of Wu is annexed by the State of Yue.

====== Japan ======
- The Hikawa Shrine is established in Saitama, Saitama.

=== 472 BC ===
==== By place ====
====== Greece ======
- Carystus in Euboea is forced to join the Delian League after the Athenians attack the city (approximate date).

==== By topic ====
====== Literature ======
- The tragedy The Persians is produced by Aeschylus. It is the oldest surviving classical Greek play.

=== 471 BC ===
==== By place ====
====== Greece ======
- Athenian politician Themistocles loses the confidence of the Athenian people, partly due to his arrogance and partly due to his alleged readiness to take bribes. As a result, he is ostracized and retires to Argos.
- The colony of Pixunte (Pixous) is founded in Magna Graecia.

=== 470 BC ===
==== By place ====
====== Greece ======
- Suspected of plotting to seize power in Sparta by instigating a helot uprising, Pausanias takes refuge in the Temple of Athena of the Brazen House to escape arrest. The sanctuary is respected, but the Spartans wall in the sanctuary and starve Pausanias to death.

==== By topic ====
====== Architecture ======
- The construction of the Temple of Zeus, begins at Olympia, Greece. This includes the relief sculpture (of which fragments now remain at the Archaeological Museum of Olympia) of Apollo with battling Lapiths and centaurs (approximate date).

====== Art ======
- The Charioteer, in the Sanctuary of Apollo, Delphi, is created in commemoration of a victory in the Pythian Games of 478 or 474 BC (approximate date). It is now preserved at the Delphi Archaeological Museum.
- Pan Painter makes a "bell krater" (an earthenware piece that is used to mix water and wine) which has a red-figure decoration of Artemis slaying Actaeon. It is now preserved at the Museum of Fine Arts in Boston (approximate date).

== Births ==
475 BC

- Philolaus, Greek philosopher (approximate year)

474 BC

- Pandukabhaya of Anuradhapura, ruler of Sri Lanka

472 BC

- Thucydides, Greek historian (d.c. 400 BC)

471 BC

- Thucydides, Greek historian (alleged date, however, 460 BC is more probable) (d. c. 395 BC)

470 BC

- Aspasia of Miletus, mistress of Pericles of Athens (d. c. 400 BC)
- Hippocrates of Chios, Greek mathematician (d. c. 410 BC)
- Mozi (or Mo Tzu), Chinese philosopher (d. c. 391)
- Socrates, Greek philosopher (d. c. 399 BC)

== Deaths ==
479 BC

- August 27: Mardonius, Persian general (killed in the Battle of Plataea)
- Confucius, Chinese philosopher (b. 551 BC)

478 BC

- Gelo, tyrant of the cities of Gela and Syracuse in Sicily
- Xenophanes, Greek poet and philosopher (approximate year)

477 BC

- Duke Dao of Qin, ruler of the state of Qin
- Emperor Itoku of Japan, according to legend.

476 BC

- Zhou Jing Wang, king of the Chinese Zhou dynasty

475 BC

- Duke Ding of Jin, ruler of Jin in ancient China (r. 511–475 BC)
- Atossa, Achaemenid queen (approximate date)

473 BC

- King Fuchai of Wu, the last king of Wu in Zhou dynasty, China

470 BC

- Pausanias, Spartan commander during the Greco-Persian Wars
