= 474 BC =

474 BC in various calendars
- Gregorian calendar: 474 BC; CDLXXIV BC
- Ab urbe condita: 280
- Ancient Egypt era: XXVII dynasty, 52
- Pharaoh: Xerxes I of Persia, 12
- Ancient Greek Olympiad (summer): 76th Olympiad, year 3
- Assyrian calendar: 4277
- Balinese saka calendar: N/A
- Bengali calendar: −1067 – −1066
- Berber calendar: 477
- Buddhist calendar: 71
- Burmese calendar: −1111
- Byzantine calendar: 5035–5036
- Chinese calendar: 丙寅年 (Fire Tiger); 2224 or 2017 — to — 丁卯年 (Fire Rabbit); 2225 or 2018
- Coptic calendar: −757 – −756
- Discordian calendar: 693
- Ethiopian calendar: −481 – −480
- Hebrew calendar: 3287–3288
- Hindu calendars
- Vikram Samvat: −417 – −416
- Shaka Samvat: N/A
- Kali Yuga: 2627–2628
- Holocene calendar: 9527
- Iranian calendar: 1095 BP – 1094 BP
- Islamic calendar: 1129 BH – 1128 BH
- Javanese calendar: N/A
- Julian calendar: N/A
- Korean calendar: 1860
- Minguo calendar: 2385 before ROC 民前2385年
- Nanakshahi calendar: −1941
- Thai solar calendar: 69–70
- Tibetan calendar: མེ་ཕོ་སྟག་ལོ་ (male Fire-Tiger) −347 or −728 or −1500 — to — མེ་མོ་ཡོས་ལོ་ (female Fire-Hare) −346 or −727 or −1499

Year 474 BC was a year of the pre-Julian Roman calendar. At the time, it was known as the Year of the Consulship of Medullinus and Vulso (or, less frequently, year 280 Ab urbe condita). The denomination 474 BC for this year has been used since the early medieval period, when the Anno Domini calendar era became the prevalent method in Europe for naming years.

== Events ==
=== By place ===
==== Italy ====
- Hiero I, tyrant of Syracuse, allied with naval forces from the maritime Greek cities of southern Italy defeats the Etruscan navy in the Battle of Cumae as the Etruscans try to capture the Greek city of Cumae. This victory marks the end of the Etruscan aggression against the Greeks in southern Italy and saves the Greeks of Campania from Etruscan domination.
- Taras signs an alliance with Rhegion, to counter the Messapians, Peucetians, and Lucanians, but the joint armies of the Tarentines and Rhegines are defeated near Kailia.
- Hiero builds Castello Aragonese on the island of Ischia.
- Consuls: Lucius Lucius Furius Medullinus and Gnaeus Manlius Vulso

=== By topic ===
==== Literature ====
- The Greek poet Pindar moves to Thebes after two years at the Sicilian Court of Hiero I of Syracuse. While at Thebes, he composes lyric odes to celebrate triumphs in the Olympic Games and other athletic events.

== Births ==
- Pandukabhaya of Anuradhapura, ruler of Sri Lanka

== Deaths ==
- Panduvasdeva
