= 340s BC =

Decade

This article concerns the period 349 BC – 340 BC.

== Births ==
343 BC

- Philetaerus, founder of the Attalid dynasty of Pergamum in Anatolia (approximate date) (d. 263 BC)

342 BC

- Menander, Greek playwright (d. 291 BC)

341 BC

- Epicurus, Greek philosopher was born in Samos

340 BC

- Appius Claudius Caecus, Roman politician and consul (approximate date)
- Chandragupta Maurya, founder of the Maurya Empire (approximate date)
- Qu Yuan, Chinese poet and minister (approximate date)

== Deaths ==
348 BC

- Plato, Greek philosopher and author

347 BC

- Archytas, Greek philosopher, mathematician and statesman (or 350 BC) (b. 428 BC)
- Plato, Greek philosopher and founder of the Academy in Athens (b. c. 427 BC)
- Eudoxus of Cnidus, Greek philosopher and astronomer who has expanded on Plato's ideas (or 355 BC) (b. 410 BC or 408 BC)

345 BC

- Nicochares, Athenian poet of the Old Comedy
- Mahanandin, last king of the Shishunaga dynasty of the Indian subcontinent.

344 BC

- Idrieus, king of Caria

343 BC

- Dionysius II, tyrant of Syracuse (b. c. 397 BC)

342 BC

- Pang Juan, Chinese general
- Antiphon, Greek arsonist, execution

340 BC

- Lais of Hyccara, Greek hetaira (courtesan) (approximate date)
- Mentor of Rhodes, Greek mercenary and satrap (approximate date)
- Xuan of Chu, Chinese king of Chu (Warring States Period)
