= 342 BC =

342 BC in various calendars
Gregorian calendar	342 BC; CCCXLII BC
Ab urbe condita	412
Ancient Egypt era	XXXI dynasty, 2
Pharaoh	Artaxerxes III of Persia, 2
Ancient Greek Olympiad (summer)	109th Olympiad, year 3
Assyrian calendar	4409
Balinese saka calendar	N/A
Bengali calendar	−935 – −934
Berber calendar	609
Buddhist calendar	203
Burmese calendar	−979
Byzantine calendar	5167–5168
Chinese calendar	戊寅年 (Earth Tiger); 2356 or 2149 — to — 己卯年 (Earth Rabbit); 2357 or 2150
Coptic calendar	−625 – −624
Discordian calendar	825
Ethiopian calendar	−349 – −348
Hebrew calendar	3419–3420
- Hindu calendars
Vikram Samvat	−285 – −284
Shaka Samvat	N/A
Kali Yuga	2759–2760
Holocene calendar	9659
Iranian calendar	963 BP – 962 BP
Islamic calendar	993 BH – 992 BH
Javanese calendar	N/A
Julian calendar	N/A
Korean calendar	1992
Minguo calendar	2253 before ROC 民前2253年
Nanakshahi calendar	−1809
Thai solar calendar	201–202
Tibetan calendar	阳土虎年 (male Earth-Tiger) −215 or −596 or −1368 — to — 阴土兔年 (female Earth-Rabbit) −214 or −595 or −1367

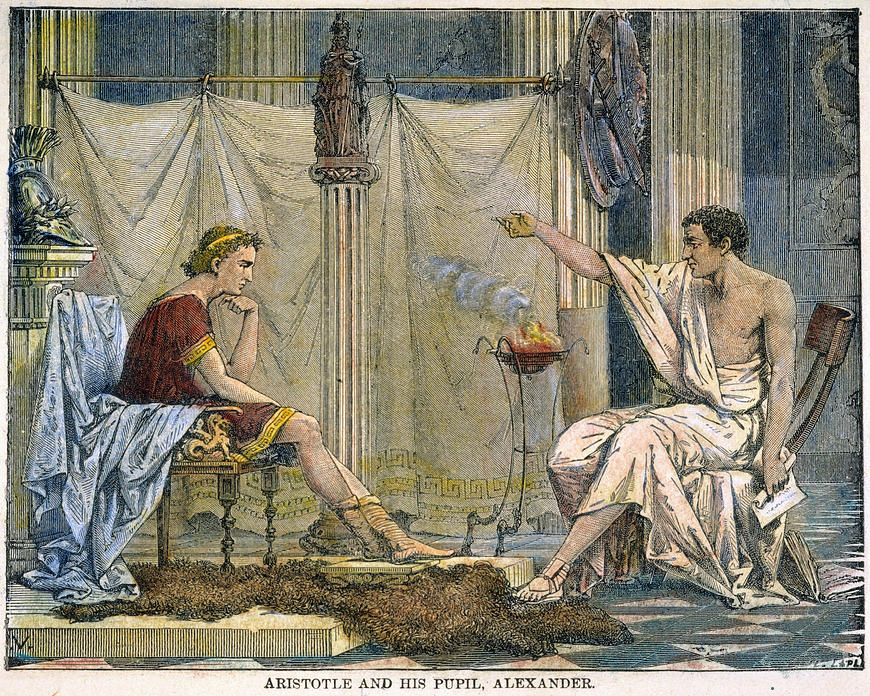
Aristotle tutoring Alexander

Year 342 BC was a year of the pre-Julian Roman calendar. At the time it was known as the Year of the Consulship of Ahala and Rutilus (or, less frequently, year 412 Ab urbe condita). The denomination 342 BC for this year has been used since the early medieval period, when the Anno Domini calendar era became the prevalent method in Europe for naming years.

== Events ==
=== By place ===
==== Macedonia ====
- The Greek philosopher, Aristotle, is invited by Philip II to his capital at Pella to tutor his son, Alexander. As the leading intellectual figure in Greece, Aristotle is commissioned to prepare Alexander for his future role as a military leader. (or 343 BC)
- Philip begins a series of campaigns in Thrace with the aim of annexing it to be a province of Macedonia. When the Macedonian army approaches Thracian Chersonese (the Gallipoli Peninsula), an Athenian general named Diopeithes ravages this district of Thrace, thus inciting Philip's rage for operating too near one of his towns in the Chersonese. Philip demands his recall. In response, the Athenian Assembly is convened. Demosthenes convinces the Athenians not to recall Diopeithes.

==== Sicily ====
- The Corinthian general Timoleon spreads his rule over Sicily, removing a number of other tyrants and preparing Sicily for another threatened Carthaginian invasion.

==== Roman Republic ====
- The Battle of Mount Gaurus is fought between the Romans and the Samnites. The battle is a success for the Romans, who, it is said, are led by Marcus Valerius Corvus. Fought at the foot of Mount Gaurus, near Cumae, it is the most notable engagement of the First Samnite War.

==== China ====
- In the course of the Warring States period, the army of the state of Qi defeats the army of the state of Wei in the Battle of Maling. This battle involves the military strategy of the general Sun Bin (descendant of Sun Tzu), and is the first battle in recorded history to give a reliable account of the handheld crossbow with trigger mechanism.

== Births ==
- Menander, Greek playwright (d. 291 BC)

== Deaths ==
- Pang Juan, Chinese general
- Antiphon, Greek arsonist, execution
