= 830 (disambiguation) =

830 may refer to:

- 830, a number in the 800s range
- AD 830 (DCCCXXX), a year in the Common Era
- 830 BC, a year Before the Common Era
- 830 AM, an AM radio frequency
- 830 (New Jersey bus), a bus route
