= Coralli (tribe) =

Ancient Thracian tribe near the Haemus Mountains

The Coralli (Ancient Greek: Κοράλλοι) were an ancient people placed by Strabo among the tribes living near the Haemus Mountains (the Balkan Mountains) and extending towards the Pontus, in Thrace. They are usually regarded as a Thracian tribe, though a Celtic origin has also been proposed. Known from a small number of Greek and Latin sources of the early Imperial period, they are otherwise little documented.

== Name ==
The Coralli are mentioned as Koralloi (Κοράλλοι) by Strabo (early 1st century AD), who lists them among the peoples of the Haemus , and as Coralli by Ovid (early 1st century AD), who names them among the barbarian peoples around Tomis (modern Constanța), his place of exile.

== Geography ==
Strabo places the Coralli among the tribes dwelling in the neighbourhood of the Balkan Mountains and extending as far as the Pontus, grouping them with the Bessi, the Maedi and the Dentheletae. This locates them in the region of the eastern Balkan Mountains and the western Black Sea coast.

== Ethnic affiliation ==
Because the tribes with which Strabo groups the Coralli (the Bessi, Maedi and Dantheletae) were Thracian, the Coralli are generally regarded as Thracian. A Celtic origin was nonetheless proposed by Christian-Joseph Guyonvarc'h on onomastic grounds, and was taken up tentatively by Alexandru Barnea, who set the Coralli alongside the Celtic place-names attested on the lower Danube.

The Coreli named by Livy among the Thracian tribes that attacked Manlius Vulso in 188 BC, a name sometimes emended to Corpili, were identified with the Coralli by J. Iliev, though Maria Gabriella Parissaki regards this identification as improbable.
