= 850 (disambiguation) =

850 may refer to:

- 850, a number in the 800s range
- AD 850 (DCCCL), a year in the Common Era
- 850 BC, a year Before the Common Era

== Technology ==
- 850 AM, an AM radio frequency
- Code page 850, a computer character set
- Area code 850, a telephone area code for part of Florida

== Transport ==
- Fiat 850
- Volvo 850
- Part of the BMW 8 Series (E31)
