= 131 =

131 may refer to:

- 131 (number), the natural number following 130 and preceding 132
- AD 131
- 131 BC
- 131 (album), the album by Emarosa
- Route 131 (MBTA), a bus route in Massachusetts, US
- 131 (New Jersey bus), the New Jersey Transit bus
- 131 Vala, a main-belt asteroid
- Fiat 131, also known as the Tofaş Murat 131, a family car
  - SEAT 131, a rebadged Fiat 131
- Tiger 131, the only operational Tiger I tank
