= 130s BC =

This article concerns the period 139 BC – 130 BC.

== Events ==
=== By place ===
==== China ====
- Emperor Wu of Han sends the diplomat Zhang Qian west to form an alliance with the Yuezhi against the Xiongnu. Wu does this after learning from Xiongnu defectors that the Xiongnu had defeated and killed the king of the Yuezhi, had expelled the Yuezhi from their lands and were using their king's skull as a wine goblet. The Yuezhi had subsequently migrated further west.
- Soon after his departure for the west, Zhang Qian is detained by Junchen Chanyu of the Xiongnu. He would remain in Xiongnu custody for more than ten years and would be given a Xiongnu wife.
- Wei Zifu enters Emperor Wu's palace as a concubine and becomes pregnant. Enraged, Liu Piao, the mother of the childless Empress Chen Jiao (wife of Emperor Wu), kidnaps Zifu's brother Wei Qing, who is rescued by Gongsun Ao. Wu responds by advancing the careers of members of the Wei family.

==== Roman Republic ====
- The Lusitanian War ends when the rebellion collapses after the assassination of Viriathus by a Roman agent.
- The Achaean League is reestablished.

=== By topic ===
==== Astronomy ====
- Hipparchus makes a very precise determination of the length of the synodic month.

== 138 BC ==
=== By place ===
==== Roman Empire ====
- Tautalus surrenders to the Romans.
- Valencia in Spain is founded as a Roman colony.

==== Asia Minor ====
- Attalus III succeeds Attalus II as Attalid king of Pergamon

==== Egypt ====
- Galaestes revolts.

==== Syria ====
- Antiochus VII expels Diodotus Tryphon.
- Tryphon sacks Beirut

==== Parthia ====
- Phraates II becomes emperor of Parthia.

==== China ====
- Grand Empress Dowager Dou, the grandmother of Emperor Wu of Han, purges the high administration of officials to consolidate her power. Among those dismissed are Prime Minister Dou Yong and her own half-brother, the General-in-Chief Tian Fen. Two of the young emperor's closest advisors, Zhao Wan and Wang Zang, are arrested and commit suicide.

=== By topic ===
==== Arts and sciences ====
- Hymn to Apollo is written and inscribed on stone in Delphi; it is the earliest surviving notated music, in a substantial and legible fragment, in the western world.

== 137 BC ==
=== By place ===
==== Roman Republic ====
- Tiberius Gracchus, quaestor in Spain, observes that slave labor has displaced small freeheld farms.
- Numantine War begins, Quintus Pompeius and M. Popilius Laenas are defeated and disgraced by the Numantians in subsequent years.
- Q. Pompeius is brought to trial by Q.Metellus and others, but acquitted.

== 136 BC ==
=== By place ===
==== China ====
- Confucianism is adopted as the state religion in China by Emperor Wu.

==== Greece ====
- Carneades retires as head of the Platonic Academy and is replaced by Polemarchus of Nicomedia.

==== Rome ====
- Censorship of Appius Claudius Pulcher and Quintus Fulvius Nobilior.

==== Spain ====
- The Romans hand Gaius Hostilius Mancinus over to the Numantians in order to repudiate his peace treaty with them.

== 135 BC ==
=== By place ===
==== Roman Republic ====
- The First Servile War starts in Sicily.
- Servius Fulvius Flaccus defeats an uprising of the Ardiaei in Illyria.
- Marcus Cosconius defeats the Scordisci in Thrace.

==== Bactria ====
- Menander I, king of the Indo-Greek Kingdom dies and is succeeded by Epander.

==== China ====
- Grand Empress Dowager Dou dies, which allows her grandson Emperor Wu to exert greater control over the empire.
- Minyue attacks Nanyue, which are both vassal states of the Han dynasty. The Han send two armies against Minyue under Wang Hui and Han Anguo, and Minyue's king Zou Ying is killed by his brother Zou Yushan, who then surrenders to the Han.
- Emperor Wu makes Zou Chou the king of Minyue, but Zou Yushan carves out two thirds of Minyue as the state of Dongyue, which Wu then recognizes.
- A Han military campaign against the Dian Kingdom establishes a military commandery in the Yunnan region.

== 134 BC ==
=== By place ===
==== Roman Republic ====
- Scipio Aemilianus, victor of Carthage, takes command in Spain against the Numantians. He recruits 20,000 men and 40,000 allies, including Numidian cavalry under Jugurtha. Scipio, an expert in sieges, builds a ring of seven forts and a ditch palisade before beginning the Siege of Numantia. The perimeter of the circumvallations is twice as long as that of the city. The river Durius (Douro), enables the defenders to be supplied by small boats.
- Caius Fulvius Flaccus, as consul, is sent against the slaves. Uprising of 4,000 slaves crushed at Sinuessa, in Campania. Slave uprisings repressed in Attic silver mines and on the island of Delos.

==== Judea ====
- John Hyrcanus becomes high priest and prince (ruler) of Judea, until 104 BC, following the murder of his father Simon Maccabaeus by Ptolemy the son of Abubus in 135 BC.

==== China ====
- On the advice of philosopher Dong Zhongshu, Emperor Wu of Han promotes Confucianism as the official doctrine of the Han dynasty and assigns special merit to the Book of Rites, the Classic of Music, the Classic of Poetry, the Book of Documents, I Ching (the Book of Changes) and the Spring and Autumn Annals.

=== By topic ===
==== Astronomy ====
- Hipparchus discovers the precession of the equinoxes.
- Hipparchus creates a star catalogue.

== 133 BC ==
=== By place ===
==== Roman Republic ====
- Lucius Calpurnius Piso Frugi, as consul, is sent against the slaves in Italy. Gaius Marius serves under Publius Cornelius Scipio Aemilianus at Numantia.
- Scipio Aemilianus captures Numantia, after a siege of eight months, suffering famine and pestilence. The remnant population of 4,000 citizens, surrender and set their city on fire. Thus ends the Numantine War.
- Tiberius Sempronius Gracchus, is elected tribune of the people. He attempts to pass a law to redistribute the public land to benefit small landowners. Opposed by wealthier factions in the Roman Senate, he is killed by a group of senators and their followers that same year.
- The Kingdom of Pergamum is deeded to Rome, Aristonicus starts a rebellion against this.

==== China ====
- June – A large army of the Han dynasty, under the overall command of Han Anguo, attempts to ambush the Xiongnu leader Junchen Chanyu in the Battle of Mayi. By pretending to betray the city of Mayi, a Han official had lured Junchen onto Han soil. However, a captured Chinese officer tips off Junchen, and so he avoids the ambush. The episode abrogates the Xiongnu-Han treaty (called heqin 和親 or "harmonious kinship") and marks the beginning of Emperor Wu's Han-Xiongnu War.
- Foreign Minister Wang Hui, who, against the opposition of Han Anguo, had advocated for war, fails to attack the retreating supply column of the Xiongnu and is sentenced to death. He commits suicide.

== 132 BC ==
=== By place ===
==== Roman Republic ====
- The First Servile War ends when Publius Rupilius quelled the rebellion.

==== Mexico ====
- The Late Formative (or pre-Classic) period of the Maya civilization begins.

== 131 BC ==
=== By place ===
==== Roman Republic ====
- During Aristonicus of Pergamon uprising against Rome, the consul Publius Licinius Crassus Mucianius is killed in the fighting.
- The Roman censor Quintus Caecilius Metellus Macedonicus attempts to remove the tribune Gaius Atinius Labeo Macerio from the Senate, the angry Atinius drags him to be thrown off the Tarpeian Rock, and Metellus is only saved by the intervention of other senators.
- For the first time in Roman history, both censors are plebeians (Metellus and Quintus Pompeius).

==== Egypt ====
- Capture of Thebes: Egyptian rebel Harsiesi seized Thebes in the summer of 131 BC, proclaimed pharaoh, for a short period of time.

== 130 BC ==
=== By place ===
==== Roman Republic ====
- Consul Marcus Perperna defeats Aristonicus in battle, besieges him at Stratonicea, dies at Pergamon.
- Roman census carried out by Quintus Pompeius and Quintus Caecilius Metellus Macedonicus.
- The tribune Gaius Papirius Carbo passes a measure allowing the use of secret ballots in legislative assemblies.

==== Egypt ====
- King Ptolemy VIII murders Ptolemy VII Neos Philopator or Ptolemy Memphites, the puppet ruler of Cleopatra II.

==== China ====
- Concubine Wei Zifu gives birth to Liu Ju, the future Crown Prince.

== Births ==
138 BC

- Lucius Cornelius Sulla, Roman general and statesman (d. 78 BC)
- Phaedrus the Epicurean, Greek scholar and philosopher

136 BC

==== Rome ====
- Lucius Gellius, politician and general.

135 BC

- Mithridates VI, king of Pontus (d. 63 BC)
- Pompeius Strabo, Roman consul and father of Pompeius Magnus (d. 87 BC)
- Posidonius of Apamea, Greek Stoic philosopher and scientist (d. 51 BC)
- Sima Qian, Chinese historian of the Han dynasty (approximate date)

134 BC

- Jin Midi, Chinese politician and co-regent (d. 86 BC)
- Posidonius of Apamea, Stoic philosopher and polymath (d. 51 BC)
- Publius Servilius Vatia Isauricus, Roman statesman (d. 44 BC)

131 BC

- Mithridates VI Eupator – king of Pontus (c.120-63 BC)

130 BC

- Publius Servilius Vatia Isauricus, Roman consul (approximate date)
- Quintus Caecilius Metellus Pius, Roman consul and general (d. 63 BC) (approximate date)

== Deaths ==
139 BC

- Viriathus, Lusitanian leader (assassinated)

138 BC

- Attalus II Philadelphus, king of Pergamon (b. 220 BC)
- Diodotus Tryphon, king of the Seleucid Empire
- Mithridates I, king of Parthia (b. c. 195 BC)

137 BC

- Dutugamunu King of Sri Lanka
- Zhao Tuo, Emperor Wu of Nanyue (b. 240 BC)

135 BC

- Menander I, king of the Indo-Greek Kingdom
- Simon Maccabaeus, prince of Judea and High Priest of Judea

134 BC

- Simon Thassi, High Priest of Judaea (r. 142-134 BC)

133 BC

- Attalus III, king of Pergamon. In his will, he makes the people of Rome his heirs (b. 170 BC)
- Tiberius Sempronius Gracchus the Roman tribune (assassination) (b. 168 BC)

132 BC

- Eunus, leader of the Slave Revolt (136–132 BC) in Sicily
- Publius Cornelius Scipio Nasica Serapio, Roman consul

131 BC

- Vasujyeshtha – Shunga Emperor
- Publius Licinius Crassus Mucianus – Roman consul and commander
- Scipio Nasica Serapio – Roman statesman

130 BC

- Appius Claudius Pulcher, Roman consul
- Ariarathes V, king of Cappadocia
- Marcus Perperna, Roman consul
- Pacuvius, Roman tragic poet (b. c. 220 BC)
- Ptolemaeus of Commagene, Seleucid satrap

== Bibliography ==
- Papazoglu, Fanula (1978). The Central Balkan Tribes in pre-Roman Times: Triballi, Autariatae, Dardanians, Scordisci and Moesians. Amsterdam: Hakkert. ISBN 978-90-256-0793-7.
