= 235 BC =

235 BC in various calendars
Gregorian calendar	235 BC; CCXXXV BC
Ab urbe condita	519
Ancient Egypt era	XXXIII dynasty, 89
Pharaoh	Ptolemy III Euergetes, 12
Ancient Greek Olympiad (summer)	136th Olympiad, year 2
Assyrian calendar	4516
Balinese saka calendar	N/A
Bengali calendar	−828 – −827
Berber calendar	716
Buddhist calendar	310
Burmese calendar	−872
Byzantine calendar	5274–5275
Chinese calendar	乙丑年 (Wood Ox); 2463 or 2256 — to — 丙寅年 (Fire Tiger); 2464 or 2257
Coptic calendar	−518 – −517
Discordian calendar	932
Ethiopian calendar	−242 – −241
Hebrew calendar	3526–3527
- Hindu calendars
Vikram Samvat	−178 – −177
Shaka Samvat	N/A
Kali Yuga	2866–2867
Holocene calendar	9766
Iranian calendar	856 BP – 855 BP
Islamic calendar	882 BH – 881 BH
Javanese calendar	N/A
Julian calendar	N/A
Korean calendar	2099
Minguo calendar	2146 before ROC 民前2146年
Nanakshahi calendar	−1702
Seleucid era	77/78 AG
Thai solar calendar	308–309
Tibetan calendar	ཤིང་མོ་གླང་ལོ་ (female Wood-Ox) −108 or −489 or −1261 — to — མེ་ཕོ་སྟག་ལོ་ (male Fire-Tiger) −107 or −488 or −1260

Year 235 BC was a year of the pre-Julian Roman calendar. At the time it was known as the Year of the Consulship of Torquatus and Bulbus (or, less frequently, year 519 Ab urbe condita). The denomination 235 BC for this year has been used since the early medieval period, when the Anno Domini calendar era became the prevalent method in Europe for naming years.

== Events ==
=== By place ===
==== Roman Republic ====
- In Rome, the consul Titus Manlius Torquatus presides over the first ever closing of the gates of the Temple of Janus, signifying peace.

==== Asia Minor ====
- Under King Attalus I, Pergamum begins to build up its power and importance.
- Antiochus Hierax defeats his brother King Seleucus II Callinicus at the Battle of Ancyra.

==== Greece ====
- Aratus of Sicyon brings Megalopolis into the Achaean League.
- The ephor, Lysander, claims to have seen a sign from the gods against King Leonidas II of Sparta so Leonidas flees to avoid his trial. In his absence Leonidas is deposed from the throne and replaced by his son-in-law Cleomenes III.

==== China ====
- The exile Lü Buwei, facing the suspicion of Ying Zheng, commits suicide.

=== By topic ===
==== Literature ====
- A work by the Latin epic poet and dramatist Gnaeus Naevius is performed for the first time.

== Births ==
- Ellalan, king of the Anuradhapura Kingdom (d. 161 BC)

== Deaths ==
- Aristippus, Greek tyrant of Argos
- Lü Buwei, Chinese politician (b. 291 BC)
