= Gnaeus Manlius Vulso =

Gnaeus Manlius Vulso is the name of:

- Gnaeus Manlius Vulso (consul 474 BC)
- Gnaeus Manlius Vulso (consul 189 BC)
