= 840s BC =

Decade

This article concerns the period 849 BC – 840 BC.

== Events and trends ==
- 842 BC—Shalmaneser III devastates the territory of Damascus; Israel and the Phoenician cities send tribute.
- 841 BC—The Compatriots Rebellion in Western Zhou dynasty. The Chinese people riot against King Li of Zhou, who is then sent to exile at a place called Zhi. The Gonghe Regency, begins. Records of the Grand Historian (compiled by historian Sima Qian by 91 BC) regards this year as the first year of consecutive annual dating of Chinese history. Any earlier events in Chinese history cannot be confidently dated by historians.
- 841 BC—The First Assyrian Invasion of Israel.

== Deaths ==
- 849 BC—Elijah, ascends to heaven in a whirlwind.
- 845 BC—Pherecles, King of Athens, dies after a reign of 19 years and is succeeded by his son Ariphron.
- 841 BC—Marquis Jing of Jin, the sixth ruler of the state of Jin.
- 841 BC—Baal-Eser II, king of Tyre.
