= 860s BC =

Decade

This article concerns the period 869 BC – 860 BC.

== Events and trends ==
- 865 BC—Kar Kalmaneser (also known as Tell Ahmar and Til Barsib), an independent Neo-Hittite kingdom located in current Syria on the banks of the Euphrates River, is conquered by the Assyrian king Ashurnasirpal II.
- 864 BC—Diognetus, King of Athens, dies after a reign of 28 years (beginning 892 BC), and is succeeded by his son Pherecles.
- 860 BC—The kingdom of Urartu is unified.

== Significant people ==
- Joash, king of Judah, is born (approximate date).
