= 390s BC =

Decade

This article concerns the period 399 BC – 390 BC.

== Births ==
398 BC

- The ‘Panke Baobab’ tree would have sprouted this during this year.

397 BC

- Dionysius II, son of Dionysius I, tyrant of Syracuse (d. 343 BC)

396 BC

- Xenocrates, Greek philosopher and scholarch (or rector) of the Academy (d. 314 BC)

390 BC

- Hypereides, Athenian orator and politician (approximate date)
- The Tollund Man (approximate date, based on his being forty years old at the time of death)

== Deaths ==
399 BC

- King Amyrtaeus of Egypt
- King Archelaus I of Macedon
- Socrates, Greek philosopher (b. c. 470 BC)

396 BC

- Himilco, Carthaginian general.

395 BC

- Lysander, Spartan general and admiral
- Tissaphernes, Persian satrap
- Shishunaga, founder of the Shishunaga dynasty of South Asia

393 BC

- Nepherites I or Nefaarud I, Pharaoh of Egypt
- Emperor Kōshō of Japan, according to legend.

392 BC

- Conon, Athenian general (approximate date)

391 BC

- Thibron, Spartan general
- Mozi, Chinese philosopher (approximate date) (b. c. 470 BC)

390 BC

- Andocides, Athenian orator and politician (b. 440 BC)
