= 291 BC =

291 BC in various calendars
Gregorian calendar	291 BC; CCXCI BC
Ab urbe condita	463
Ancient Egypt era	XXXIII dynasty, 33
Pharaoh	Ptolemy I Soter, 33
Ancient Greek Olympiad (summer)	122nd Olympiad, year 2
Assyrian calendar	4460
Balinese saka calendar	N/A
Bengali calendar	−884 – −883
Berber calendar	660
Buddhist calendar	254
Burmese calendar	−928
Byzantine calendar	5218–5219
Chinese calendar	己巳年 (Earth Snake); 2407 or 2200 — to — 庚午年 (Metal Horse); 2408 or 2201
Coptic calendar	−574 – −573
Discordian calendar	876
Ethiopian calendar	−298 – −297
Hebrew calendar	3470–3471
- Hindu calendars
Vikram Samvat	−234 – −233
Shaka Samvat	N/A
Kali Yuga	2810–2811
Holocene calendar	9710
Iranian calendar	912 BP – 911 BP
Islamic calendar	940 BH – 939 BH
Javanese calendar	N/A
Julian calendar	N/A
Korean calendar	2043
Minguo calendar	2202 before ROC 民前2202年
Nanakshahi calendar	−1758
Seleucid era	21/22 AG
Thai solar calendar	252–253
Tibetan calendar	阴土蛇年 (female Earth-Snake) −164 or −545 or −1317 — to — 阳金马年 (male Iron-Horse) −163 or −544 or −1316

Year 291 BC was a year of the pre-Julian Roman calendar. At the time it was known as the Year of the Consulship of Megellus and Brutus (or, less frequently, year 463 Ab urbe condita). The denomination 291 BC for this year has been used since the early medieval period, when the Anno Domini calendar era became the prevalent method in Europe for naming years.

== Events ==
=== By place ===
==== Greece ====
- Demetrius Poliorcetes joins his son, Antigonus, in the siege of Thebes. As the Thebans defend their city stubbornly, Demetrius forces his men to attack the city at great cost. Demetrius finally takes the city after using siege engines to demolish its walls.

==== Roman Republic ====
- Third Samnite War:

- The proconsul Q. Fabius Maximus Gurges and legate Q. Fabius Maximus Rullianus besiege the Samnite town of Cominium Ocritum, but the consul Lucius Postumius Megellus orders Fabius Gurges to relinquish his command and evacuate Samnium, despite the fact that the Senate had appointed Fabius proconsul to campaign against the Samnites.
- Fabius Gurges celebrates a triumph, at which the Samnite general Gavius Pontius is beheaded.
- Postumius captures Cominium Ocritum, the major city of Venusia and other towns, killing 10,000 and capturing 6200. At the proposal of Postumius, the Senate sends 20,000 colonists to occupy Venusia, the largest Roman colony to date. However, angered by the various crimes of Postumius, the Senate does not choose him as one of the leaders of the colony and denies him a triumph.
- Postumius celebrates a triumph on his own authority and dismisses his army before the consuls for the following year can take over.

==== China ====
- Generals Sima Cuo and Bai Qi of the State of Qin attack the State of Wei and capture the city of Yuan. Next, Sima Cuo captures the cities of Zhi and Deng.
- Bai Qi then captures the city of Wan in the state of Chu.

== Births ==
- Lü Buwei, Chinese politician and chancellor of the Qin State (d. 235 BC)

== Deaths ==
- Menander, Athenian dramatist, considered to be a master of Greek New Comedy (b. c. 342 BC)
- Dinarchus, Athenian speech writer whose work is generally thought to reflect the gradual decline of Attic oratory (b. c. 361 BC)
- Gavius Pontius, Samnite general
- Emperor Kōan of Japan, according to legend.
