= 131 BC =

131 BC in various calendars
- Gregorian calendar: 131 BC; CXXXI BC
- Ab urbe condita: 623
- Ancient Egypt era: XXXIII dynasty, 193
- Pharaoh: Ptolemy VIII Physcon, 15
- Ancient Greek Olympiad (summer): 162nd Olympiad, year 2
- Assyrian calendar: 4620
- Balinese saka calendar: N/A
- Bengali calendar: −724 – −723
- Berber calendar: 820
- Buddhist calendar: 414
- Burmese calendar: −768
- Byzantine calendar: 5378–5379
- Chinese calendar: 己酉年 (Earth Rooster); 2567 or 2360 — to — 庚戌年 (Metal Dog); 2568 or 2361
- Coptic calendar: −414 – −413
- Discordian calendar: 1036
- Ethiopian calendar: −138 – −137
- Hebrew calendar: 3630–3631
- Hindu calendars
- Vikram Samvat: −74 – −73
- Shaka Samvat: N/A
- Kali Yuga: 2970–2971
- Holocene calendar: 9870
- Iranian calendar: 752 BP – 751 BP
- Islamic calendar: 775 BH – 774 BH
- Javanese calendar: N/A
- Julian calendar: N/A
- Korean calendar: 2203
- Minguo calendar: 2042 before ROC 民前2042年
- Nanakshahi calendar: −1598
- Seleucid era: 181/182 AG
- Thai solar calendar: 412–413
- Tibetan calendar: ས་མོ་བྱ་ལོ་ (female Earth-Bird) −4 or −385 or −1157 — to — ལྕགས་ཕོ་ཁྱི་ལོ་ (male Iron-Dog) −3 or −384 or −1156

Year 131 BC was a year of the pre-Julian Roman calendar. At the time it was known as the Year of the Consulship of Mucianus and Flaccus (or, less frequently, year 623 Ab urbe condita) and the Fourth Year of Yuanguang. The denomination 131 BC for this year has been used since the early medieval period, when the Anno Domini calendar era became the prevalent method in Europe for naming years.

== Events ==
=== By place ===
==== Roman Republic ====
- During Aristonicus of Pergamon uprising against Rome, the consul Publius Licinius Crassus Mucianius is killed in the fighting.
- The Roman censor Quintus Caecilius Metellus Macedonicus attempts to remove the tribune Gaius Atinius Labeo Macerio from the Senate, the angry Atinius drags him to be thrown off the Tarpeian Rock, and Metellus is only saved by the intervention of other senators.
- For the first time in Roman history, both censors are plebeians (Metellus and Quintus Pompeius).

==== Egypt ====
- Capture of Thebes: Egyptian rebel Harsiesi seized Thebes in the summer of 131 BC, proclaimed pharaoh, for a short period of time.

== Deaths ==
- Vasujyeshtha – Shunga Emperor
- Publius Licinius Crassus Mucianus – Roman consul and commander
- Scipio Nasica Serapio – Roman statesman

== Births ==
- Mithridates VI Eupator – king of Pontus (c.120-63 BC)
