= 890s BC =

Decade

This article concerns the period 899 BC – 890 BC.

== Events and trends ==
- 899 BC — The first year of King Yih of Zhou's reign is marked by a solar eclipse.
- 892 BC — Megacles, King of Athens, dies after a reign of 30 years and is succeeded by his son Diognetus.
- 892 BC — King Xiao of Zhou overthrows King Yih of Zhou and takes the throne.
- 891 BC — Tukulti-Ninurta II succeeds his father Adad-nirari II as king of Assyria.
