= 810s BC =

Decade

This article concerns the period 819 BC – 810 BC.

== Events and trends ==
- 817 BC—Pedubastis I declares himself king of Egypt, founding the Twenty-third Dynasty.
- 814 BC—Carthage is founded by Phoenician colonists from modern-day Lebanon, led by queen Dido. The city developed into a maritime power that dominated the Mediterranean Sea.
- 811 BC—Adad-nirari III succeeds his father Shamshi-Adad V as king of Assyria.

== Significant people ==
- Homer, semi-mythological Greek writer, born (approximate date)
