= 460s BC =

Decade

This article concerns the period 469 BC – 460 BC.

== Events ==
=== 469 BC ===
==== By place ====
====== Greece ======
- The island of Naxos wishes to secede from the Delian League, but is blockaded by Athens and forced to surrender. Naxos becomes a tribute-paying member of the Delian League. This action is considered high-handed and resented by the other Greek city states.
- Themistocles, after being exiled from Athens, makes his way across the Aegean to Magnesia, an inland Ionian city under Persian rule.

=== 468 BC ===
==== By place ====
====== Greece ======
- Sparta faces trouble near home, chiefly from Arcadia with the support of Argos. Argos regains control of Tiryns.

====== Roman Republic ======
- Antium is captured by Roman forces.

====== China ======
- Zhou Zhen Ding Wang becomes the twenty-eighth sovereign of the Chinese Zhou dynasty.

==== By topic ====
====== Literature ======
- Sophocles, Greek playwright, defeats Aeschylus for the Athenian Prize.

=== 467 BC ===
==== By place ====
====== Roman Republic ======
- Quintus Fabius Vibulanus becomes consul of the Roman Republic for the first of three times.

====== Sicily ======
- After the death of his brother Hiero I, Thrasybulus becomes Tyrant of Syracuse.

==== By topic ====
====== Literature ======
- Aeschylus writes Seven Against Thebes and wins the Dionysia.
- Aeschylus' play, The Persians is produced in Sicily.

=== 466 BC ===
==== By place ====
====== Greece ======
- Cimon carries the war against Persia into Asia Minor and wins the Battle of the Eurymedon in Pamphylia. This is a decisive defeat of the Persians as Cimon's land and sea forces capture the Persian camp and destroy or capture the entire Persian fleet of 200 triremes (manned by Phoenicians). Many new allies of Athens are now recruited, such as the trading city of Phaselis on the Lycian-Pamphylian border.

====== Italy ======
- The Tyrant, Thrasybulus, is driven out by the citizens of Syracuse, Sicily. The city moves to a democratic system of government.
- The Greek colony of Taras, in Magna Graecia, is defeated by the native population of Apulia. As a result, the Tarentine monarchy falls, with the installation of a democracy.

=== 465 BC ===
==== By place ====
====== Persian Empire ======
- King Xerxes I of the Persian Empire, together with his eldest son, is murdered by one of his Ministers, Artabanus the Hyrcanian. The Persian general, Megabyzus, is thought to have been one of the conspirators in the assassination.
- Artabanus gains control of the Achaemenid state for several months. However, he is betrayed by Megabyzus and is killed by Xerxes' son, Artaxerxes.

====== Greece ======
- Thasos revolts from the Delian League. The revolt arises from rivalry over trade with the Thracian hinterland and, in particular, over the ownership of a gold mine. Athens under Kimon lays siege to Thasos after the Athenian fleet defeats the Thasos fleet

==== By topic ====
====== Arts ======
- Tholos, west side of Ancient Agora of Athens, is built (approximate date).
- Phidias begins producing the sculpture called The Athena Promachos (The Defender) and completes it ten years later.

=== 464 BC ===
==== By place ====
====== Greece ======
- Sparta suffers the effects of a severe earthquake leading to a large loss of life.
- When the Messenian helots (serfs) revolt against their Spartan masters following the severe earthquake, King Archidamus II organises the defence of Sparta. The helots fortify themselves at Mount Ithome.

====== Persian Empire ======
- Egypt seizes the opportunity created by the murder of Xerxes I to revolt against Persia. The revolt is led by Inaros, a Libyan, who gains control of the Delta region and is aided by the Athenians.
- Artaxerxes I succeeds Xerxes as king of the Persian empire.

=== 463 BC ===
==== By place ====
====== Rome ======
- The Senate and People of Rome appoint Gaius Aemilius Mamercus interrex.

====== Greece ======
- In Athens, the democratic statesman Ephialtes and the young Pericles attempt to get the oligarchic Kimon ostracized for allegedly receiving bribes. Kimon is charged by Pericles and other democratic politicians with having been bribed not to attack the King of Macedonia (who may have been suspected of covertly helping the Thasian rebels). Though Kimon is acquitted, his influence on the Athenian people is waning.
- Themistocles, who is in exile, approaches the Persian King Artaxerxes I seeking Persian help in regaining power in Athens. Artaxerxes is unwilling to help him, but gives him the satrapy of Magnesia.
- After a two year siege, Thasos falls to the Athenians under Kimon who compels the Thasians to destroy their walls, surrender their ships, pay an indemnity and an annual contribution to Athens.

=== 462 BC ===
==== By place ====
====== Greece ======
- The Spartans try to conquer the mountain stronghold of Mt Ithome in Messenia, where a large force of rebellious helots have taken refuge. They ask their allies from the Persian Wars, including the Athenians, to help.
- Kimon seeks the support of Athens' citizens providing help to Sparta. Although Ephialtes maintains that Sparta is Athens' rival for power and should be left to fend for itself, Kimon's view prevails. Kimon then leads 4,000 hoplites to Mount Ithome.
- After an attempt to storm Mt. Ithome fails, the Spartans start to distrust the Athenians over concerns that they may take the side of the helots. Retaining their other allies, the Spartans sent Kimon and his men home. This insulting rebuff causes the collapse of Kimon's popularity at Athens. Outrage over the dismissal swings Athenian opinion towards Ephialtes' views.
- Ephialtes passes a law in the Athenian ecclesia, which reforms the Areopagus, limiting its power to judging cases of homicide and religious crimes. He considers the Areopagus to be the centre of conservatism and Ephialtes' victory is seen as a defeat for the conservatives and the members of the oligarchy.
- Argos, taking advantage of Spartan preoccupation with the revolt of its helots, finally conquers Mycenae. The inhabitants of the town are dispersed, with some finding their way into Macedonia.
- Pericles starts to effectively be the leader of Athens.

==== By topic ====
====== Philosophy ======
- The Greek philosopher, Anaxagoras, moves to Athens and begins teaching there.

=== 461 BC ===
==== By place ====
====== Greece ======
- In Athens, Ephialtes and Pericles finally get agreement to the ostracism of Kimon, who had become unpopular for his unsuccessful pro-Spartan policy.
- Ephialtes, with the support of Pericles, reduces the power of the Athenian Council of Areopagus (filled with ex-archons and so a stronghold of oligarchy) and transfers them to the people, i.e. the Council of Five Hundred, the Assembly and the popular law courts. The office of Judge is made a paid position and is recruited by lot from a list to which every citizen can have his name added.
- Ephialtes is murdered by Aristodicus of Tanagra in Boeotia, who is said to have acted on behalf of members of the Athenian oligarchy.
- The ostracism of Kimon and the murder of Ephialtes leave Pericles as the most influential orator in Athens.

=== 460 BC ===
==== By place ====
====== Persian Empire ======
- Egypt revolts against Persian rule. The Egyptian leader, Inaros, asks Athens for assistance, which is willingly provided as Athens has plans to trade with and colonise Egypt. A force of 200 Athenian triremes, which is campaigning in Cyprus, is immediately ordered to Egypt to render assistance.
- Achaemenes, Persian satrap (governor) of Egypt, is defeated and slain in a battle at Papremis, on the banks of the Nile River, by Egyptian forces.
- The construction of the ceremonial complex of Apadana (the audience hall of Darius I and Xerxes I) in Persepolis is completed.

====== Greece ======
- The First Peloponnesian War breaks out between the Delian League (led by Athens) and a Peloponnesian alliance (led by Sparta), caused in part by Athens' alliance with Megara and Argos and the subsequent reaction of Sparta. The Athenians have built long walls for the Megarans to their port at Nisaea, thereby earning the enmity of Megara's old rival Corinth.
- Argos rises against Sparta. Athens supports Argos and Thessaly. The small force that is sent by Sparta to quell the uprising in Argos is defeated by a joint Athenian and Argos force at Oenoe. (Battle of Oenoe)

====== Roman Republic ======
- Conflicts arise between the Roman patricians and plebeians. There is also a revolt by Rome's slaves. During the revolt, the Campidoglio is held by the slaves for a lengthy period, along with the most important temples of Rome. It is during this revolt that consul Publius Valerius Publicola dies. The revolt only ends with the arrival of an army from Tusculum, led by Tusculan dictator Lucius Mamilius. Meanwhile, Lucius Quinctius Cincinnatus is appointed as consul to replace Publicola.

==== Siculi ====
- Ducetius, a Hellenised leader of the Siculi, an ancient people of Sicily, takes advantage of the confusion that follows the collapse of the tyranny in Syracuse and other Sicilian states. With the support of the Syracusan democracy, he drives out the colonists of the former tyrant Hieron from Catana and restores it to its original inhabitants.

==== By topic ====
====== Arts ======
- Polygnotos of Thasos decorates the Painted Stoa, on the north side of Ancient Agora of Athens (approximate date).
- The construction of a sculpture of a Young Warrior (subsequently found in the sea off Riace, Italy) is begun and completed approximately ten years later. It is now preserved at the Museo Archeologico Nazionale, Reggio Calabria, Italy.
- The sculpture Apollo with battling Lapiths and centaurs is built on the west pediment of the Temple of Zeus in Olympia (approximate date). Only fragments remain and are today preserved at the Archaeological museum in Olympia.
- A metope relief of Athena, Heracles and Atlas are made on a frieze in the Temple of Zeus in Olympia (approximate date). It is now preserved at the Archaeological museum in Olympia.
- A statue of Apollo is cast (approximate date), of which today remains one leg, preserved at the Louvre, and the head, known as the Chatsworth Head, preserved at the British Museum.

== Births ==
469 BC

- Socrates, Athenian philosopher (approximate date) (d. 399 BC)

460 BC

- Democritus of Abdera, Greek philosopher (approximate year) (d. 370 BC)
- Hippocrates of Cos, Greek physician (approximate year) (d. 375 BC)

== Deaths ==
469 BC

- King Yuan of Zhou (Ji Ren), 27th king of the Zhou dynasty of China
- Duke Chu of Wey, 30th and 33rd ruler of state of Wey
- Leotychides, king of Sparta (b. c.545 BC)

468 BC

- Aristides, Athenian statesman (b. 530 BC)

467 BC

- Hiero I, Tyrant of Syracuse

466 BC

- King Xerxes I of Persia.

465 BC

- Xerxes I, king of Persia (murdered) (b. c. 519 BC)
- King Goujian of Yue, king of the Chinese State of Yue

461 BC

- Ephialtes, leader of the radical democrats in Athens (assassinated)

460 BC

- Epicharmus, Greek poet (b. 550 BC)
- Panini, Hindu Indian grammarian (b. 520 BC)
- Themistocles, Athenian politician and naval strategist (b. 525 BC)
- Achaemenes, Persian satrap (governor) of Egypt
- Publius Valerius Publicola, Roman consul
