= 478 BC =

478 BC in various calendars
- Gregorian calendar: 478 BC; CDLXXVIII BC
- Ab urbe condita: 276
- Ancient Egypt era: XXVII dynasty, 48
- Pharaoh: Xerxes I of Persia, 8
- Ancient Greek Olympiad (summer): 75th Olympiad, year 3
- Assyrian calendar: 4273
- Balinese saka calendar: N/A
- Bengali calendar: −1071 – −1070
- Berber calendar: 473
- Buddhist calendar: 67
- Burmese calendar: −1115
- Byzantine calendar: 5031–5032
- Chinese calendar: 壬戌年 (Water Dog); 2220 or 2013 — to — 癸亥年 (Water Pig); 2221 or 2014
- Coptic calendar: −761 – −760
- Discordian calendar: 689
- Ethiopian calendar: −485 – −484
- Hebrew calendar: 3283–3284
- Hindu calendars
- Vikram Samvat: −421 – −420
- Shaka Samvat: N/A
- Kali Yuga: 2623–2624
- Holocene calendar: 9523
- Iranian calendar: 1099 BP – 1098 BP
- Islamic calendar: 1133 BH – 1132 BH
- Javanese calendar: N/A
- Julian calendar: N/A
- Korean calendar: 1856
- Minguo calendar: 2389 before ROC 民前2389年
- Nanakshahi calendar: −1945
- Thai solar calendar: 65–66
- Tibetan calendar: ཆུ་ཕོ་ཁྱི་ལོ་ (male Water-Dog) −351 or −732 or −1504 — to — ཆུ་མོ་ཕག་ལོ་ (female Water-Boar) −350 or −731 or −1503

Year 478 BC was a year of the pre-Julian Roman calendar. At the time, it was known as the Year of the Consulship of Mamercus and Structus (or, less frequently, year 276 Ab urbe condita). The denomination 478 BC for this year has been used since the early medieval period, when the Anno Domini calendar era became the prevalent method in Europe for naming years.

== Events ==
=== By place ===
==== Greece ====
- Despite Spartan opposition, Athens works on refortifying and rebuilding after the Persian destruction of the city in 479.
- The Delian League is established
- With the help of the Athenian statesman and general, Cimon, Aristides commands an Athenian fleet of 30 ships that the Spartan commander Pausanias leads to capture the Greek cities on Cyprus and Byzantium, taking them from the Persians and their Phoenician allies.
- While Pausanias is occupying Byzantium, his arrogance and his adoption of Persian clothing and manners offends the allies and raises suspicions of disloyalty. Pausanias is recalled to Sparta, where he is tried and acquitted of the charge of treason, but he is not restored to his command.

==== Sicily ====
- Hiero I (Hieron) becomes the Tyrant of Syracuse following the death of his brother Gelo.

==== China ====
- A Temple of Confucius is established in (modern-day) Qufu.

== Deaths ==
- Gelo, tyrant of the cities of Gela and Syracuse in Sicily
- Xenophanes, Greek poet and philosopher (approximate year)
