= 870s BC =

Decade

This article concerns the period 879 BC – 870 BC.

== Events and trends ==
- 879 BC—Kalhu is dedicated. Some historians say that Assurnasirpal II gives a banquet for 69,574 persons to celebrate it.
- 878 BC—Zhou li wang becomes king of the Zhou dynasty of China.
- 874 BC—Osorkon II succeeds Takelot I as king of the Twenty-second Dynasty of Egypt.
- 874 BC—Ahab becomes king of Israel (approximate date).
- 872 BC—An exceptionally high flood of the Nile covers the floors of the Temple of Luxor.
- 871 BC—Asa the King of Judah dies after sitting on the throne for 41 years.

== Births ==
- 877 BC—Parshvanatha, the 23rd Tirthankara of Jainism.
- Jehu, king of Israel (approximate date).
- Ahaziah, king of Judah, is born (approximate date).

== Deaths ==
- 879 BC—Zhou yi wang, king of the Zhou dynasty of China.

== Bibliography ==
- Sangave, Dr. Vilas Adinath (2001). Facets of Jainology: Selected Research Papers on Jain Society, Religion, and Culture. Mumbai: Popular Prakashan. ISBN 978-81-7154-839-2.
- Fisher, Mary Pat (1997). Living Religions: An Encyclopedia of the World's Faiths. London: I.B.Tauris. ISBN 1-86064-148-2.
