= 950s BC =

Decade

The 950s BC is a decade that lasted from 959 BC to 950 BC.

== Events and trends ==
- 959 BC—Psusennes II succeeds Siamun as king of Egypt.
- 957 BC—Solomon's Temple is completed. 959 BC is also a proposed date.
- 957 BC—The reign of Mu Wang of the Zhou dynasty begins.
- 952 BC—Thersippus, King of Athens dies after a reign of 41 years and is succeeded by his son Phorbas.
- 950 BC—Northern Egypt starts to be ruled by Libyan pharaohs. The Libyans build cities and for the first time a sturdy urban life grows up in the Nile Delta.
- c. 950 BC–800 BC—Some early parts of the Bible are written.
- c. 950 BC—Kurukshetra War

== Births ==
- Osorkon I, pharaoh of Egypt, is born (approximate date).
- King Parikshit of Kuru dynasty is born.

== Deaths ==
- King Zhao of Zhou, drowned in 957 BC
