= 920s BC =

Decade

The 920s BC is a decade that lasted from 929 BC to 920 BC.

== Events and trends ==
- 928 BC — On the death of King Solomon, his son Rehoboam is unable to hold the tribes of Israel together, and the northern part secedes to become the kingdom of Israel, making Jeroboam its king. Rehoboam is left to rule the kingdom of Judah.
- 925 BC — Military conquest of Canaan by Shoshenq I.
- 924 BC or 922 BC — Osorkon I succeeds his father Shoshenq I as king of Egypt.
- 922 BC — Phorbas, Archon of Athens, dies after a reign of 30 years and is succeeded by his son Megacles.
- 920 BC — A transit of Venus occurs.
