= Antiphon (arsonist) =

Antiphon (Ancient Greek: Ἀντιφῶν) of Athens was contemporary of the orator Demosthenes. For some offense his name was removed from the list of Athenian citizens, whereupon he went to Philip of Macedonia. He pledged himself to the king, that he would destroy by fire the Athenian arsenal in Piraeus; but when he arrived there with this intention, he was arrested by Demosthenes and accused of treachery. He was found guilty, and put to death in 342 BCE.
