= 476 BC =

476 BC in various calendars
- Gregorian calendar: 476 BC; CDLXXVI BC
- Ab urbe condita: 278
- Ancient Egypt era: XXVII dynasty, 50
- Pharaoh: Xerxes I of Persia, 10
- Ancient Greek Olympiad (summer): 76th Olympiad (victor)¹
- Assyrian calendar: 4275
- Balinese saka calendar: N/A
- Bengali calendar: −1069 – −1068
- Berber calendar: 475
- Buddhist calendar: 69
- Burmese calendar: −1113
- Byzantine calendar: 5033–5034
- Chinese calendar: 甲子年 (Wood Rat); 2222 or 2015 — to — 乙丑年 (Wood Ox); 2223 or 2016
- Coptic calendar: −759 – −758
- Discordian calendar: 691
- Ethiopian calendar: −483 – −482
- Hebrew calendar: 3285–3286
- Hindu calendars
- Vikram Samvat: −419 – −418
- Shaka Samvat: N/A
- Kali Yuga: 2625–2626
- Holocene calendar: 9525
- Iranian calendar: 1097 BP – 1096 BP
- Islamic calendar: 1131 BH – 1130 BH
- Javanese calendar: N/A
- Julian calendar: N/A
- Korean calendar: 1858
- Minguo calendar: 2387 before ROC 民前2387年
- Nanakshahi calendar: −1943
- Thai solar calendar: 67–68
- Tibetan calendar: ཤིང་ཕོ་བྱི་བ་ལོ་ (male Wood-Rat) −349 or −730 or −1502 — to — ཤིང་མོ་གླང་ལོ་ (female Wood-Ox) −348 or −729 or −1501

Year 476 BC was a year of the pre-Julian Roman calendar. At the time, it was known as the Year of the Consulship of Rutilus and Structus (or, less frequently, year 278 Ab urbe condita). The denomination 476 BC for this year has been used since the early medieval period, when the Anno Domini calendar era became the prevalent method in Europe for naming years.

== Events ==
=== By place ===
==== Greece ====
- Convicted in Sparta on the charge of accepting a bribe from the Aleudae family whilst leading an expedition to Thessaly against the family for their collaboration with the Persians, the Spartan King Leotychidas flees to the temple of Athena Alea in Tegea, Arcadia. A sentence of exile is passed upon him; his house is razed, and his grandson, Archidamus II, ascends the Spartan throne in his place.
- Cimon of Athens increases his power at the expense of Themistocles. He ousts Pausanias and the Spartans from the area around the Bosporus. The Spartans, hearing that Pausanias is intriguing with the Persians, recall him and he is "disciplined".
- Under the leadership of Kimon, the Delian League continues to fight Persia and to remove the Ionian cities from Persian administration. The conquest of Eion on the Strymon from Persia is led by Cimon.

=== By topic ===
==== Literature ====
- The Greek poet Pindar visits Sicily and is made welcome at the courts of Theron of Acragas and Hieron I of Syracuse. They commission some of his greatest poetry. It is through these connections that Pindar's reputation spreads all over the Greek world.

== Deaths ==
- Zhou Jing Wang, king of the Chinese Zhou dynasty
