= 910s BC =

Decade

The 910s BC is a decade that lasted from 919 BC to 910 BC.

== Events and trends ==
- 915 BC (by William F. Albright) – Death of Rehoboam, King of the ancient Kingdom of Judah.
- 911 BC – Adad-nirari II succeeds his father Ashur-Dan II as king of Assyria.
- 911 BC – Abijah, king of Judah, dies.
- 910 BC – Nadab, king of Israel succeeds his father Jeroboam I after he reigns of 22 years and dies.

== Significant people ==
- Ashurnasirpal II, king of Assyria, is born (approximate date).
- Omri, king of Israel, is born (approximate date).
