= 940s BC =

Decade

The 940s BC is a decade that lasted from 949 BC to 940 BC.

== Events and trends ==
- 949 BC Mahaparinirvana of the historical Buddha Shakyamuni Siddharta, according to far eastern schools of Buddhism.
- 946 BC—Zhou gong wang becomes king of the Zhou dynasty of China.
- 945 BC—Egypt: Psusennes III dies, the last king of the Twenty-First Dynasty. Shoshenq I succeeds him, the founder of the Twenty-second Dynasty.
- 940 BC—The Temple of Solomon was finished being built.

== Births ==
- Adad-nirari II, king of Assyria, is born (approximate date).
- Nadab, king of Israel, is born (approximate date).
- Abijah, king of Judah, is born (approximate date).
- Asa, king of Judah, is born (approximate date).

== Deaths ==
- 947 BC— Zhou mo wang, King of the Zhou dynasty of China.
