= 850s BC =

Decade

This article concerns the period 859 BC – 850 BC.

== Events and trends ==
- 859 BC—Assurnasirpal II dies.
- 859 BC—Shalmaneser attacks Syria and Israel.
- 858 BC—Aramu becomes king of Urartu.
- 858 BC—Shalmaneser III succeeds Assurnasirpal II as king of Assyria.
- 854 BC or 853 BC—Shalmaneser III battles a Syrian coalition (including king Ahab of Kingdom of Israel and Hadadezer) in the battle of Qarqar.
- 850 BC—Takelot II succeeds Osorkon II as King of Egypt.
- c. 850 BC—Homer composes the Iliad and Odyssey.
- c. 850 BC—Mesha erects the Mesha Stele, the Moabite Stone; the story is 34 lines, nearly complete and reveals the name 'Israel', a story of Mesha's revolt against the Kingdom of ancient Israel.
- Nazarites and Rechabites establish early temperance movement.

== Births ==
- Shamshi-Adad V, king of Assyria, is born (approximate date).

== Deaths ==
- Feizi, 1st Ruler of Qin
