= 930s BC =

Decade

The 930s BC is a decade that lasted from 939 BC to 930 BC.

== Events and trends ==
- 934 BC—Ashur-dan II succeeds his father as King of Assyria.
- 931 BC—Solomon dies in Jerusalem. The country splits into two kingdoms: Israel (including the cities of Shechem and Samaria) in the north and Judah (containing Jerusalem) in the south.

== Births ==
- Baasha, king of Israel, is born (approximate date).

== Deaths ==
- 935 BC—Zhou gong wang, king of the Zhou dynasty of China.
- 935 BC—Tiglath-Pileser II, king of Assyria.
- 931 BC Solomon, king of the united monarchy of Israel.
