= 960s BC =

Decade

The 960s BC is a decade that lasted from 969 BC to 960 BC.

== Events and trends ==
- 967 BC—Tiglath-Pileser II becomes King of Assyria.
- 967 BC—Solomon becomes king of the Israelites. (962 BC—traditional date)
- 965 BC—David, king of the ancient Israelites, died.

== Significant people ==
- Solomon becomes king of the Kingdom of Israel
- Snake Spine, Ajaw of Palenque, semi legendary (967 BC-?)
- Ashur-Dan II, king of Assyria, is born (approximate date).
- Jereboam, king of Israel, is born (approximate date).
- Rehoboam, king of Judah, is born (approximate date).
