= Lucius Furius Medullinus (consul 474 BC) =

Roman politician, consul in 474 BC

- Office: Consul (474 BC)

Lucius Furius Medullinus (fl. c. 474–473 BC) was a Roman politician in the 5th century BC, and consul in 474 BC.

== Biography ==
In 474 BC, he was consul with Manlius Vulso. His colleague Manlius imposed a truce on Veii, which lasted 40 years. With the return of peace, the consuls proceeded with a census of the population, which was evaluated at 103,000 citizens.

In the following year, Furius and his colleague were brought to trial by the tribune Gnaeus Genucius for failing to appoint the decemvirs to allocate the public lands. However, on the day of the trial Genucius was found dead, and as a consequence the charges were dismissed.

== Bibliography ==
=== Ancient bibliography ===
- Livy, Ab urbe condita
- Dionysius of Halicarnassus, Roman Antiquities
- Diodorus Siculus, Bibliotheca Historica

=== Modern bibliography ===
- Broughton, T. Robert S. (1951), The American Philological Association (ed.), "The Magistrates of the Roman Republic", Philological Monographs, number XV, volume I, vol. I, 509 B.C. - 100 B.C., New York

Political offices
Preceded by Publius Valerius Poplicola; Gaius Nautius Rutilus	Roman consul 474 BC with Aulus Manlius Vulso	Succeeded by Lucius Aemilius Mamercus; Vopiscus Julius Iullus
