= 1000s BC (decade) =

Decade

The 1000s BC is a decade that lasted from 1009 BC to 1000 BC.

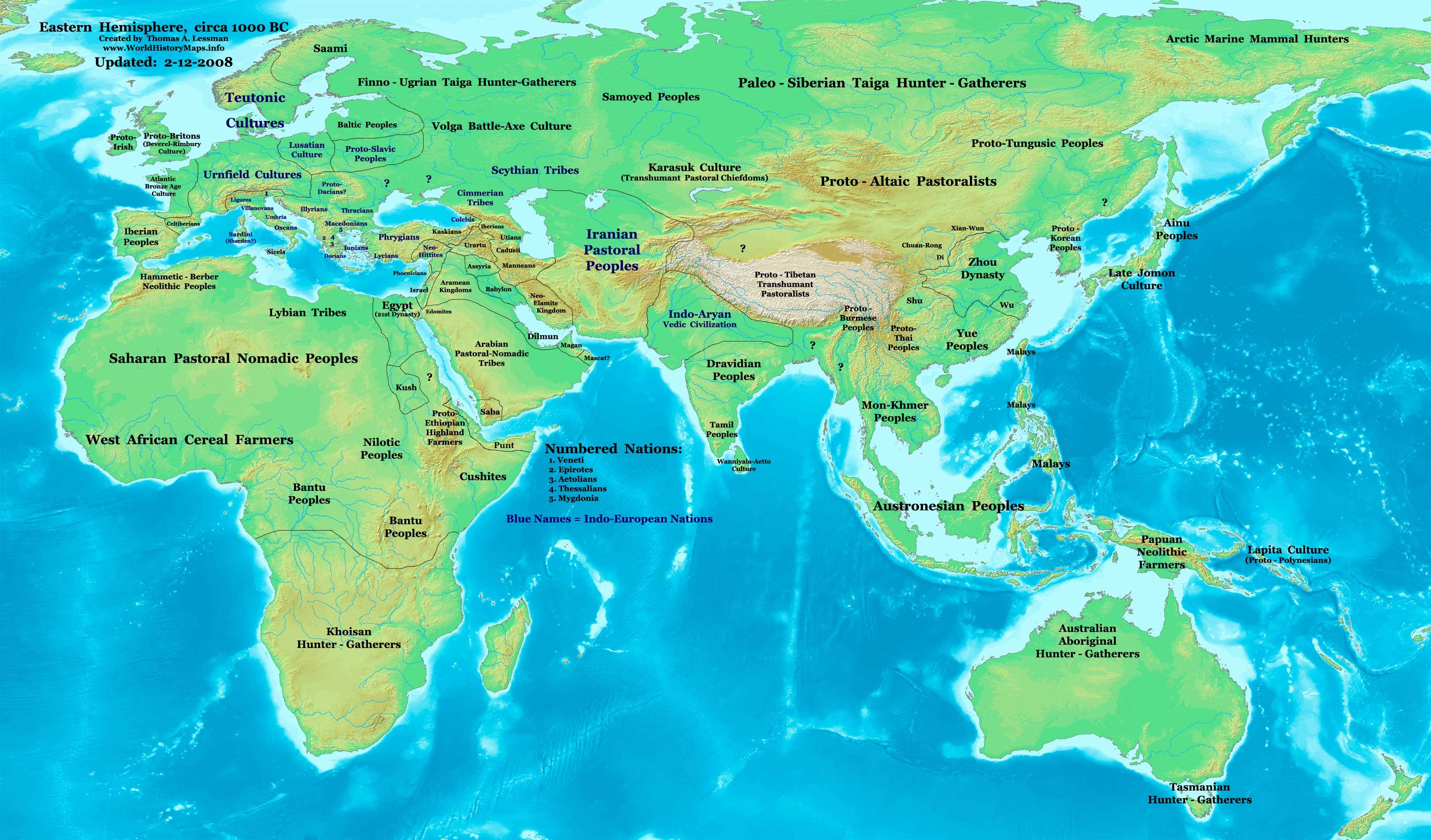
Map of the Eastern Hemisphere in 1000 BC

== Events and trends ==
- 1006 BC—David becomes king of the ancient United Kingdom of Israel (traditional date). ( see)
- Earliest evidence of farming in the Kenya highlands.
- c. 1000 BC—Iron Age starts.
- c. 1000 BC—The United Kingdom of Israel reaches its largest size, it is Israel's golden age.
- c. 1000 BC—Nok culture in Nigeria.
- c. 1000 BC—Latins come to Italy from the Danube region.
- c. 1000 BC—Assyrians started to conquer neighbouring regions.
- 1000 BC—World population: 50,000,000
- 1000 BC—Priene, Western Anatolia is founded.
- c. 1000 BC—Hungarian separates from its closest linguistic relatives, the Ob-Ugric languages.
- c. 1000 BC—Ancient Iranian peoples enter Persia.
- c. 1000 BC—Villanovans occupy the northern and western Italy.
- c. 1000 BC—Phoenician alphabet is invented.
- c. 1000 BC—Rice is cultivated in Vietnam.
- 1000 BC—Early Horizon period starts in the Andes.
- c. 1000 BC—Chavin culture starts in the Andes.
- c. 1000 BC—Paracas culture starts in the Andes.
- c. 1000 BC—Historical beginning of the peoples we later know as Illyrians
- c. 1000 BC—Rough carbon-14 dating of the Cherchen Man.

== Significant people ==
- Saul, king of Israel (1037 BC-1010 BC) (according to the Hebrew Bible)
- David, king of the ancient Israelites (1006 BC–965 BC) (see)
- Solomon, also king of Israel (see)
- Zoroaster, ancient Iranian prophet (approximate date, estimates range from 1000 BC to 600 BC)
