= 830s BC =

Decade

This article concerns the period 839 BC – 830 BC.

== Events and trends ==
- 836 BC—Shalmaneser III of Assyria leads an expedition against the Tabareni.
- 836 BC—Civil war breaks out in Egypt.

== Significant people ==
- Adad-nirari III, king of Assyria, is born (approximate date).
- Shoshenq IV, pharaoh of Egypt is born (approximate date).
