= Gnaeus Manlius Vulso (consul 474 BC) =

Consul of the Roman Republic in 5th century BC

Consul of the Roman Republic
- In office 1 August 474 BC – 31 July 473 BC Serving with Lucius Furius Medullinus (consul 474 BC)
- Preceded by: Publius Valerius Poplicola (consul 475 BC), Gaius Nautius Rutilus
- Succeeded by: Lucius Aemilius Mamercus, Vopiscus Julius Iulus

Personal details
- Born: Unknown; Ancient Rome
- Died: Unknown; Ancient Rome

Gnaeus Manlius Vulso was Roman consul in 474 BC with Lucius Furius Medullinus Fusus.

The historian Livy calls him Gaius. Most modern writers refer to him as Aulus, assuming that he is the same person as the decemvir of 451 BC, who is called Aulus in the Fasti Capitolini. However, the chronology of this family makes this extremely improbable, leading to the conclusion that he was in fact Gnaeus, the father of the decemvir. The praenomina Gnaeus and Gaius were often confused in early records, which would account for the appearance of that name in Livy's history.

== Life ==
His father's name was Gaius (or Gnaeus), and his grandfather's Publius.

In his consulship, Manlius was assigned the war against Veii. The Veientes sued for peace, which the Romans accepted. Upon the Veientes giving tribute of corn and money for the Roman troops, a truce of forty years was agreed. As a consequence, Manlius gained the honour of an ovation on his return to Rome, which he celebrated on 15 March 474 BC.

In the following year, Manlius and his colleague were brought to trial by the tribune Gnaeus Genucius for failing to appoint the decemvirs to allocate the public lands. However, on the day of the trial Genucius was found dead, and as a consequence the charges were dismissed.

== See also ==
- Manlia (gens)

Political offices
Preceded by Publius Valerius Poplicola, and Gaius Nautius Rutilus	Consul of the Roman Republic; 474 BC with Lucius Furius Medullinus Fusus	Succeeded by Lucius Aemilius Mamercus, and Vopiscus Julius Iulus
