= Harsiesi =

Rebel Pharaoh (in Upper Egypt)
- Reign: 131–130 BC
Royal titulary
Nomen
Harsiesi Sausir
Ḥr-sA-Js(t ) sA-Wsjr
- Father: Paious?
- Died: September 130 BC
- Dynasty: (?)

Harsiesi (died September 130 BC) was an ancient Egyptian rebel against the rule of Ptolemy VIII Physcon of the Ptolemaic Dynasty.

== Biography ==
Probably the same person of "Harsiesi, son of Paious" (Paious meaning "Enemy of the gods"), he was arguably the last native Egyptian to call himself "Pharaoh", although ruling only in the southern part of Upper Egypt and only for a brief period.

Taking advantage of the civil war between Ptolemy VIII and his sister Cleopatra II, Harsiesi captured Thebes in the summer of 131 BC and likely assumed pharaonic titles, although only his nomen is known, Ḥr-sA-Js(t ) sA-Wsjr, meaning "Harsiesi, son of Osiris" (literally "Horus-son-of-Isis, son of Osiris"), as reported on the demotic papyrus Karara 1, 2. Ptolemy's forces recaptured the city in November of the same year, yet Harsiesi led the rebellion until his death, which likely occurred in September 130 BC.
