= Achilles =

Greek mythological hero

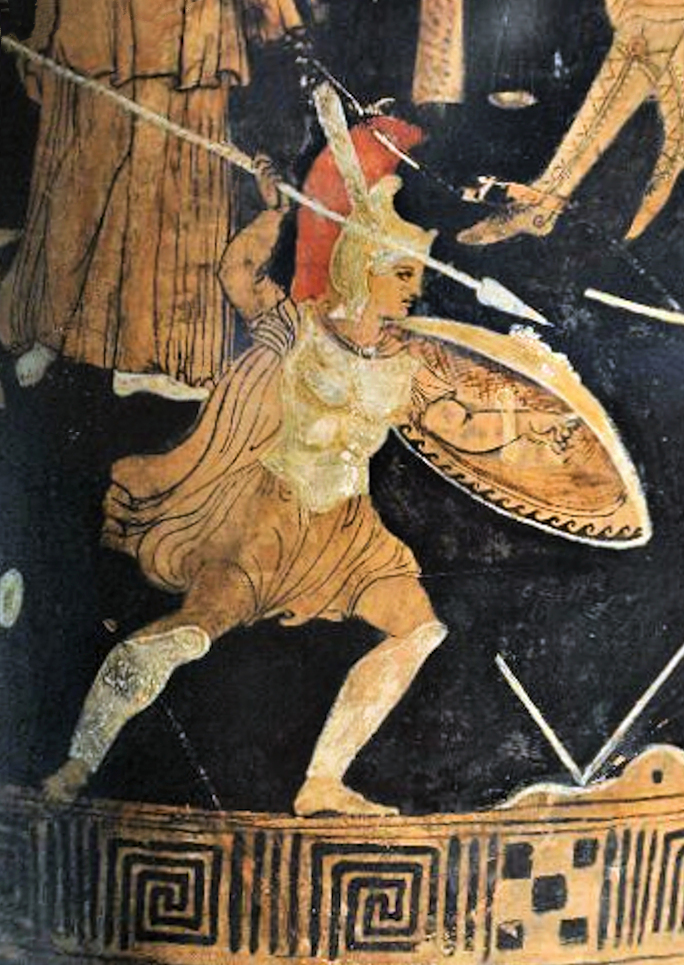
- Ancient Greek polychromatic pottery painting (dating c. 300 BC) of Achilles during the Trojan War
- Abode: Phthia

Genealogy
- Parents: Peleus (father); Thetis (mother)
- Siblings: Polymele
- Consort: Deidamia
- Children: Neoptolemus, Oneiros

In Greek mythology, Achilles (/əˈkɪliːz/ ə-KIL-eez) or Achilleus (Ancient Greek: Ἀχιλλεύς, romanized: Achilleús) was a hero of the Trojan War who was known as being the greatest of all the Greek warriors. The central character in Homer's Iliad, he was the son of the Nereid Thetis and Peleus, king of Phthia and famous Argonaut. Achilles was raised in Phthia along with his childhood companion Patroclus and received his education from Chiron, a centaur. In the Iliad, he is presented as the commander of the mythical tribe of the Myrmidons.

Achilles's most notable feat during the Trojan War was the slaying of the Trojan prince Hector outside the gates of Troy. Although the death of Achilles is not presented in the Iliad, other sources concur that he was killed near the end of the Trojan War by Paris, who shot him with an arrow. Later legends (beginning with Statius's unfinished epic Achilleid, written in the first century AD) state that Achilles was invulnerable in all of his body except for one heel. According to that myth, when his mother Thetis dipped him in the river Styx as an infant, she held him by one of his heels, leaving it untouched by the waters and thus his only vulnerable body part.

Alluding to these legends, the term Achilles' heel has come to mean a point of weakness which can lead to downfall, especially in someone or something with an otherwise strong constitution. The Achilles tendon is named after him following the same legend.

== Etymology ==
Linear B tablets attest to the personal name Achilleus in the forms a-ki-re-u and a-ki-re-we, the latter being the dative of the former. The name grew more popular, becoming common soon after the seventh century BC and was also turned into the female form Ἀχιλλεία (Achilleía), attested in Attica in the fourth century BC (IG II² 1617) and, in the form Achillia, on a stele in Halicarnassus as the name of a female gladiator fighting an "Amazon".

Achilles's name can be analyzed as a combination of ἄχος (áchos), 'distress, pain, sorrow, grief', and λαός (laós), 'people, soldiers, nation', resulting in a proto-form *Akhí-lāu̯os, 'he who has the people distressed' or 'he whose people have distress'. The grief or distress of the people is a theme raised numerous times in the Iliad (and frequently by Achilles himself). Achilles's role as the hero of grief or distress forms an ironic juxtaposition with the conventional view of him as the hero of κλέος kléos ('glory', usually in war). Furthermore, laós has been construed by Gregory Nagy, following Leonard Palmer, to mean 'a corps of soldiers', a muster. With this derivation, the name obtains a double meaning in the poem: when the hero is functioning rightly, his men bring distress to the enemy, but when wrongly, his men get the grief of war. The poem is in part about the misdirection of anger on the part of leadership.

Some researchers deem the name a loan word, possibly from a pre-Greek language. Achilles's descent from the Nereid Thetis and a similarity of his name with those of river deities such as Acheron and Achelous have led to speculations about his being an old water divinity. Robert S. P. Beekes has suggested a pre-Greek origin of the name, based among other things on the coexistence of -λλ- and -λ- in epic language, which may account for a palatalized phoneme /l^{y}/ in the original language.

=== Other names ===
Among the appellations under which Achilles is generally known are the following:

- Pyrisous, "saved from the fire", his first name, which seems to favour the tradition in which his mortal parts were burned by his mother Thetis
- Aeacides, from his grandfather Aeacus
- Aemonius, from Aemonia, a country which afterwards acquired the name of Thessaly
- Aspetos, "inimitable" or "vast", his name at Epirus
- Larissaeus, from Larissa (also called Cremaste), a town of Achaia Phthiotis in Thessaly
- Ligyron, his original name
- Nereius, from his mother Thetis, one of the Nereids
- Pelides, from his father, Peleus
- Phthius, from his birthplace, Phthia
- Podarkes, "swift-footed", from the wings of Arke (Ἄρκη, 'swift') being attached to his feet (πόδες, podes)

== Birth and early years ==
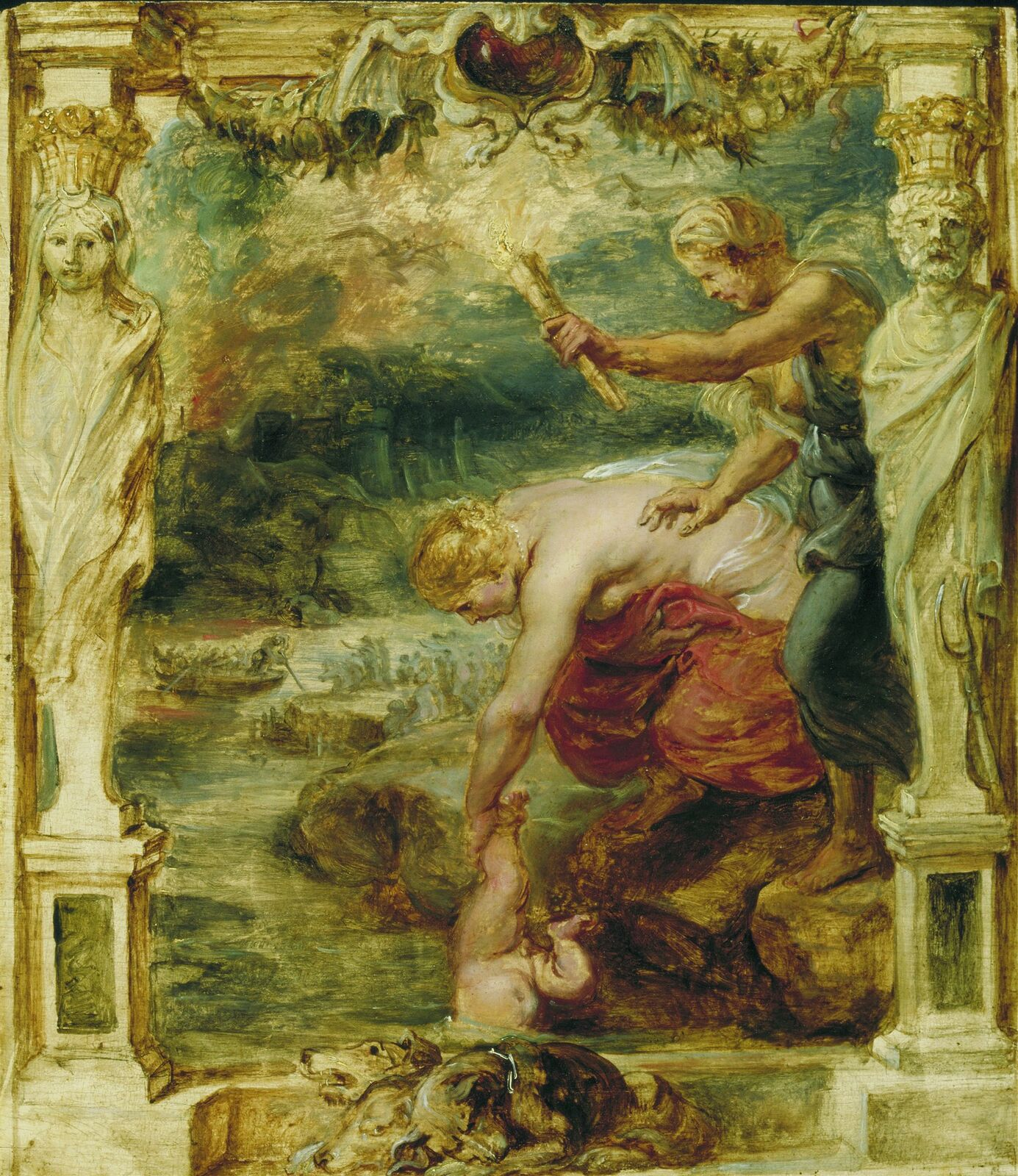
Thetis Dipping the Infant Achilles into the River Styx by Peter Paul Rubens (c. 1625; Museum Boijmans Van Beuningen, Rotterdam)

Achilles was the son of Thetis—a Nereid and daughter of the Old Man of the Sea—and Peleus, the king of the Myrmidons. Zeus and Poseidon had been rivals for Thetis's hand in marriage until Prometheus, the fore-thinker, warned Zeus of a prophecy (originally uttered by Themis, goddess of divine law) that Thetis would bear a son greater than his father. For this reason, the two gods withdrew their pursuit, and had her wed Peleus.

There is a tale which offers an alternative version of these events: In the Argonautica (4.760) Zeus's sister and wife Hera alludes to Thetis's chaste resistance to the advances of Zeus, pointing out that Thetis was so loyal to Hera's marriage bond that she coolly rejected the father of gods. Thetis, although a daughter of the sea-god Nereus, was also brought up by Hera, further explaining her resistance to the advances of Zeus. Zeus was furious and decreed that she would never marry an immortal.

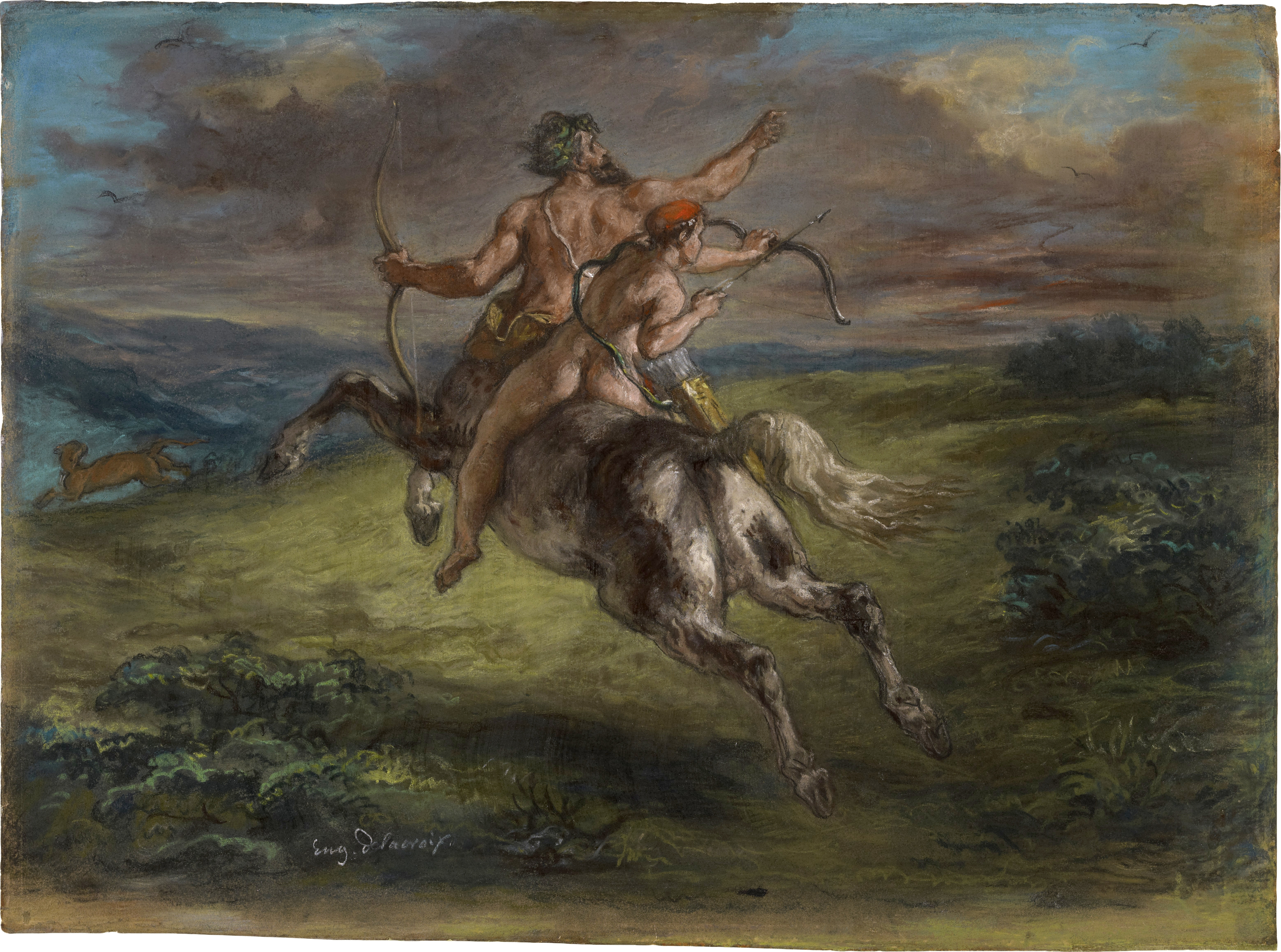
The Education of Achilles, by Eugène Delacroix, pastel on paper, c. 1862 (Getty Center, Los Angeles)

According to the Achilleid, written by Statius in the first century AD, and to non-surviving previous sources, when Achilles was born Thetis tried to make him immortal by dipping him in the river Styx; however, he was left vulnerable at the part of the body by which she held him: his left heel. It is not clear if this version of events was known earlier. In another version of this story, Thetis anointed the boy in ambrosia and put him on top of a fire in order to burn away the mortal parts of his body. She was interrupted by Peleus and abandoned both father and son in a rage.

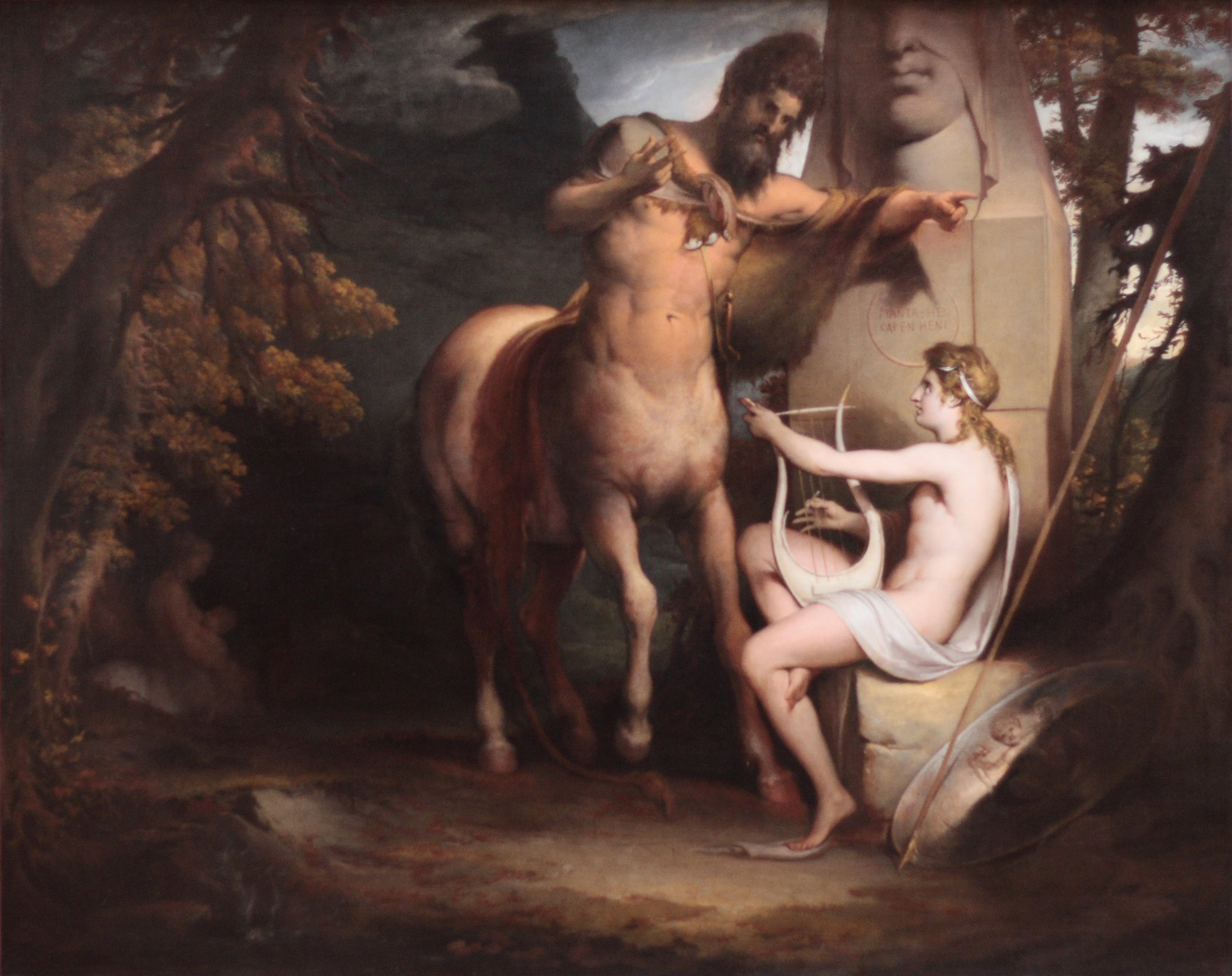
The Education of Achilles (c. 1772), by James Barry (Yale Center for British Art)

None of the sources before Statius make any reference to this general invulnerability. To the contrary, in the Iliad, Homer mentions Achilles being wounded: in Book 21 the Paeonian hero Asteropaios, son of Pelagon, challenged Achilles by the river Scamander. He was ambidextrous, and cast a spear from each hand; one grazed Achilles's elbow, "drawing a spurt of blood". In the few fragmentary poems of the Epic Cycle which describe the hero's death (i.e. the Cypria, the Little Iliad by Lesches of Pyrrha, the Aethiopis and Iliupersis by Arctinus of Miletus), there is no trace of any reference to his general invulnerability or his famous weakness at the heel. In the later vase paintings presenting the death of Achilles, the arrow (or in many cases, arrows) hit his torso.

Peleus entrusted Achilles to Chiron, who lived on Mount Pelion and was known as the most righteous of the Centaurs, to be reared. In some accounts, Achilles's original name was "Ligyron" and he was later named Achilles by his tutor Chiron. According to Homer, Achilles grew up in Phthia with his childhood companion Patroclus. Homer further writes that Achilles taught Patroclus what he himself had been taught by Chiron, including the medical arts. Thetis foretold that her son's fate was either to gain glory and die young, or to live a long but uneventful life in obscurity. Achilles chose the former, and decided to take part in the Trojan War.

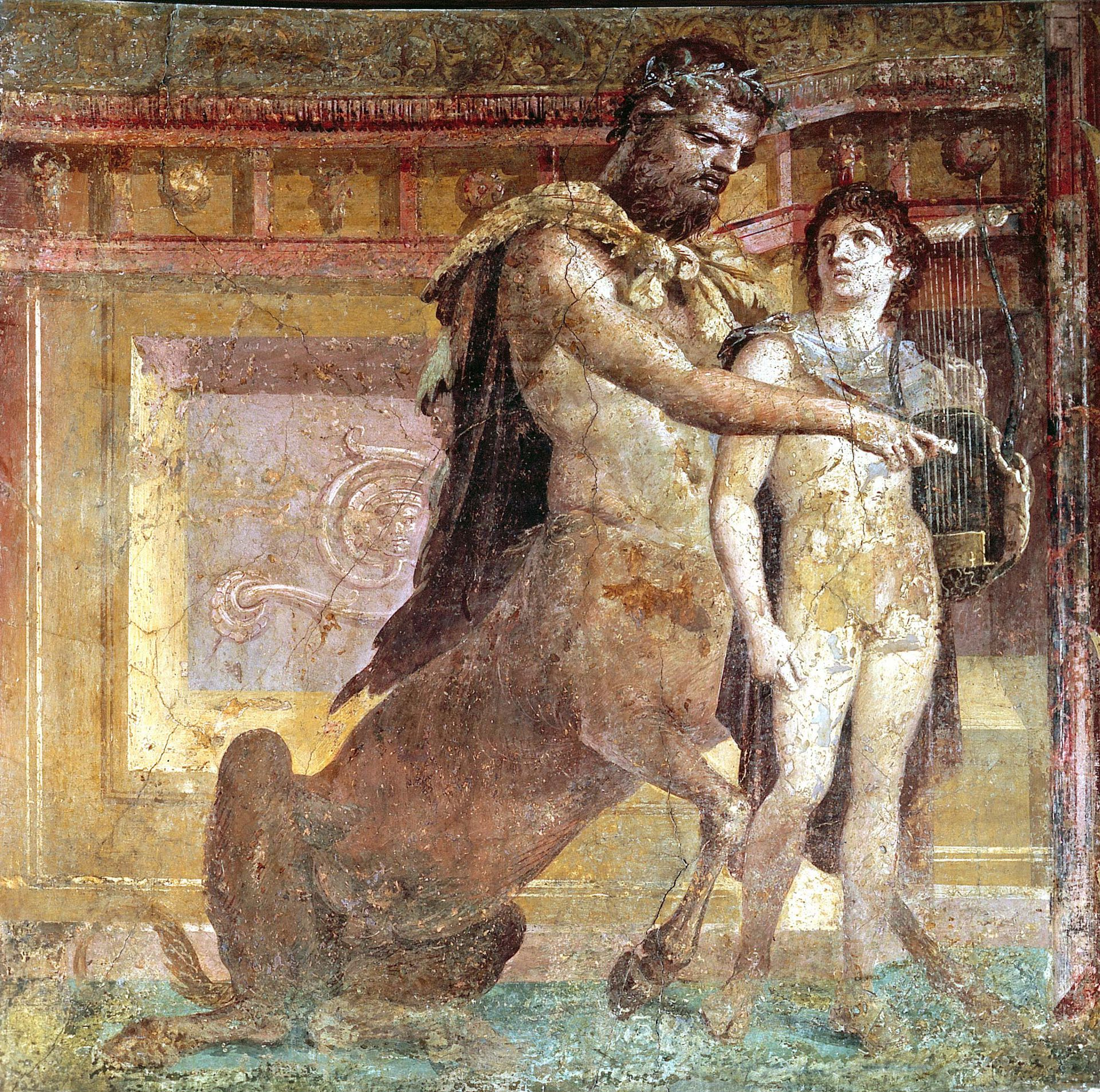
Chiron teaching Achilles how to play the lyre, Roman fresco from Herculaneum, first century AD

According to Photius, the sixth book of the New History by Ptolemy Hephaestion reported that Thetis burned in a secret place the children she had by Peleus. When she had Achilles, Peleus noticed, tore him from the flames with only a burnt foot, and confided him to the centaur Chiron. Later Chiron exhumed the body of the Damysus, who was the fastest of all the giants, removed the ankle, and incorporated it into Achilles's burnt foot. Photius also claims that Achilles had a Carthaginian mentor named Noemon.

=== Physical description ===
In Homer's Iliad, Achilles is portrayed as tall and striking, with strength and looks that were unmatched among the Greek warriors. Homer describes him as having long hair or a mane (χαίτη). Along with some other characters, his hair is described with the word xanthḗ (ξανθή), which meant 'yellow' and was used for light hair, including blond, brown, tawny (light brown) and auburn. Philostratus wrote that his eyes were amber and lion-like. A later Latin account, probably from the fifth century AD, falsely attributed to Dares Phrygius described Achilles as having "... a large chest, a fine mouth, and powerfully formed arms and legs. His head was covered with long wavy chestnut-colored hair (capillo myrteo, color of myrtus bark or myrrh). Though mild in manner, he was very fierce in battle. His face showed the joy of a man richly endowed."

=== Hidden on Skyros ===
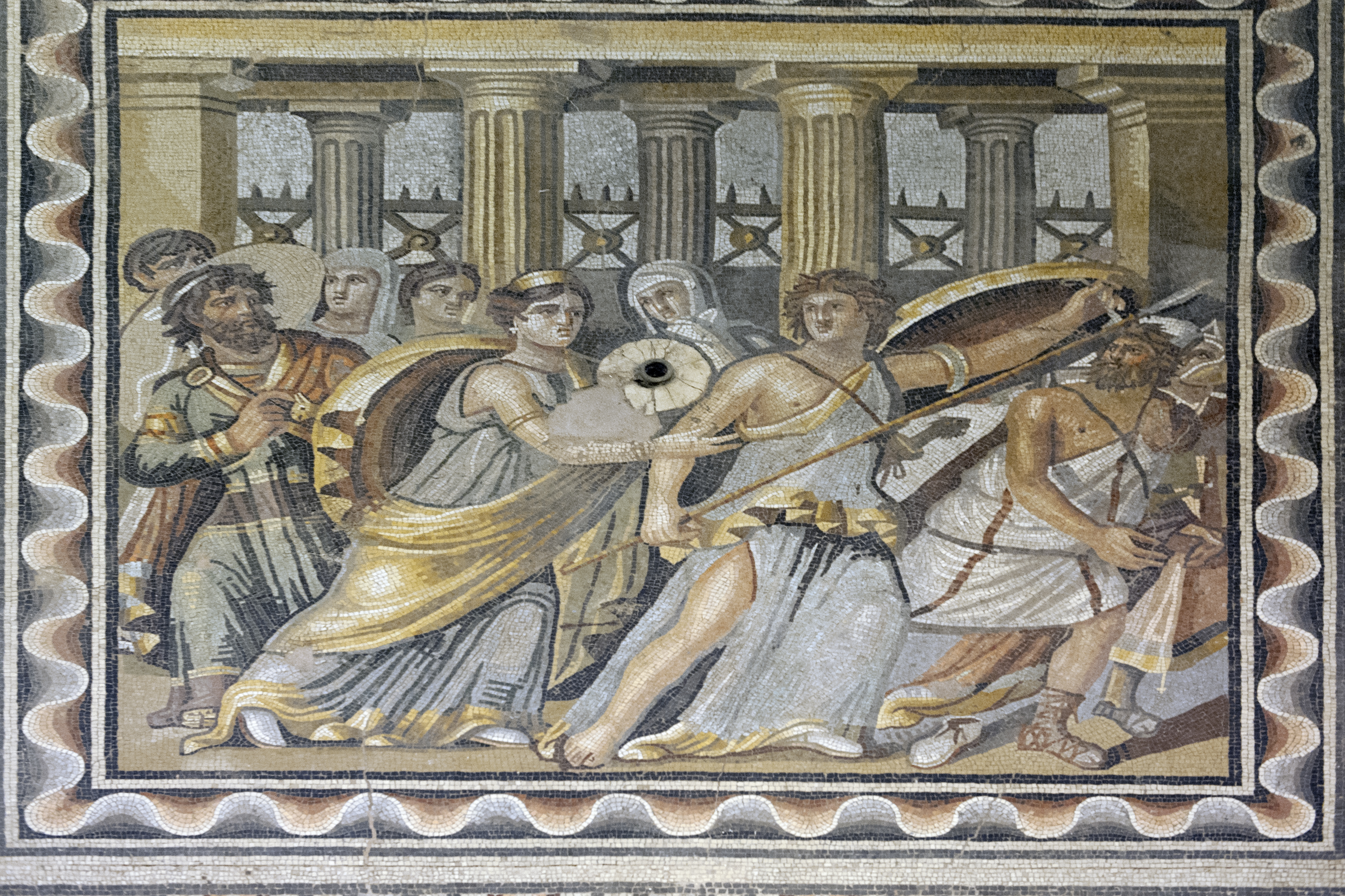
A Roman mosaic from the Poseidon Villa in Zeugma, Commagene (now in the Zeugma Mosaic Museum) depicting Achilles disguised as a woman and Odysseus tricking him into revealing himself

Some post-Homeric sources claim that in order to keep Achilles safe from the war, Thetis (or, in some versions, Peleus) hid the young man dressed as a princess or at least a girl at the court of Lycomedes, king of Skyros.

There, Achilles, properly disguised, lived among Lycomedes's daughters, perhaps under the name "Pyrrha" (the red-haired girl), Cercysera or Aissa ("swift"). With Lycomedes's daughter Deidamia, with whom he had begun a relationship, Achilles there fathered two sons, Neoptolemus (also called Pyrrhus, after his father's possible alias) and Oneiros. According to this story, Odysseus learned from the prophet Calchas that the Achaeans would be unable to capture Troy without Achilles's aid. Odysseus went to Skyros in the guise of a pedlar selling women's clothes and jewellery and placed a shield and spear among his goods. When Achilles instantly took up the spear, Odysseus saw through his disguise and convinced him to join the Greek campaign. In another version of the story, Odysseus arranged for a trumpet alarm to be sounded while he was with Lycomedes's women. While the women fled in panic, Achilles prepared to defend the court, thus giving his identity away.

Other accounts, such as Homer and the Epic Cycle, record different stories. In the Iliad, Achilles is said to have conquered Skyros. In the Cypria and Little Iliad, he lands there after having joined the Greek army in their attack on Mysia. Various scholia record that, before the war, Peleus sent his son to put down a Dolopian rebellion on the island.

== In the Trojan War ==
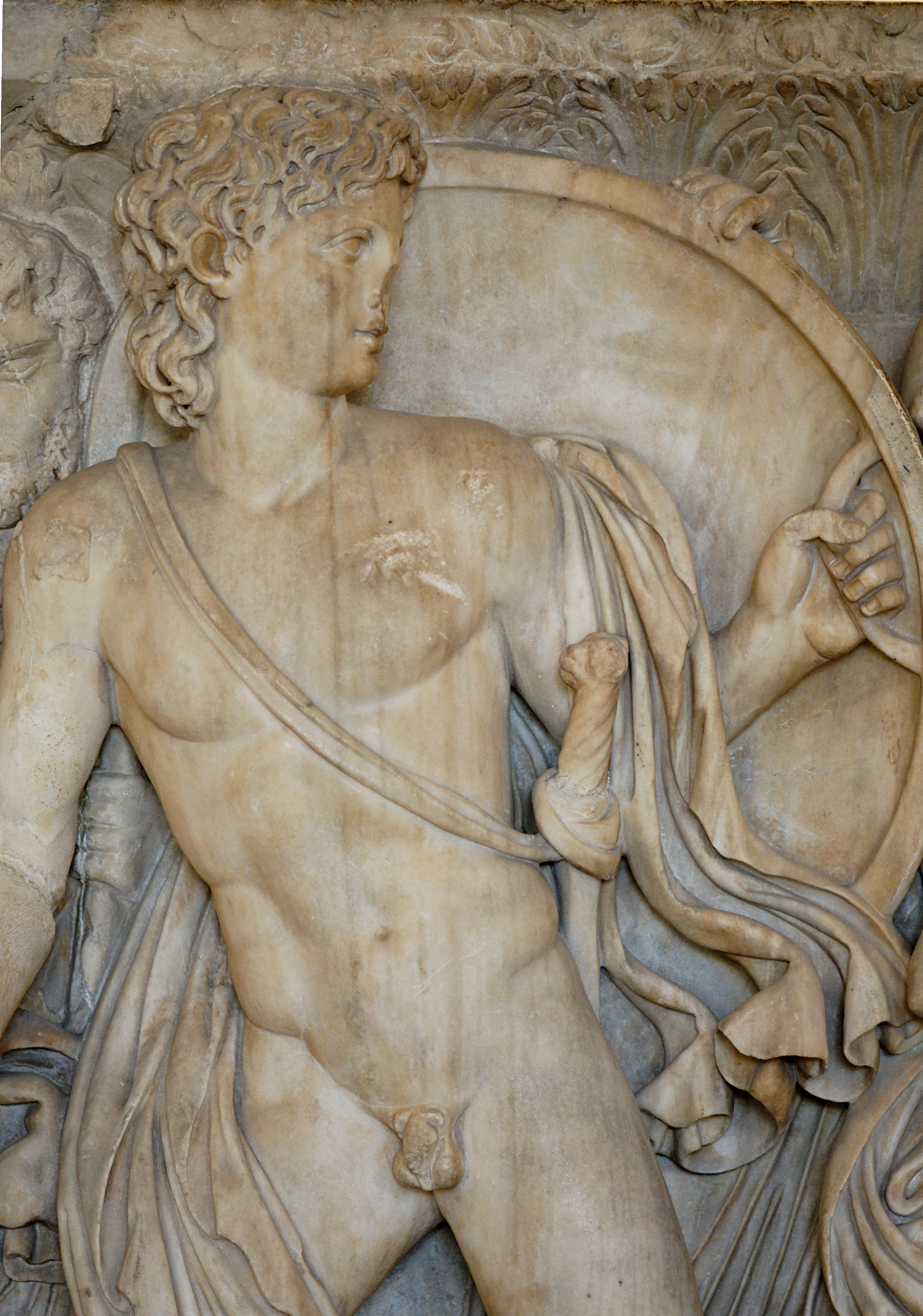
A marble representation of Achilles at the court of King Lycomedes, c. 240 AD

Homer refers to Hellenes as an originally relatively small tribe settled in Thessalic Phthia, centered along the settlements of Alos, Alope, Trachis, and the Pelasgian Argos. This Homeric Hellas is described as "καλλιγύναικος", kalligýnaikos 'of beautiful women', and its warriors, the Hellenes, along with the feared Myrmidons, were under the command of Achilles.

According to the Iliad, Achilles arrived at Troy with 50 ships, each carrying 50 Myrmidons. He appointed five leaders (each leader commanding 500 Myrmidons): Menesthius, Eudorus, Peisander, Phoenix and Alcimedon.

=== Telephus ===
When the Greeks left for the Trojan War, they accidentally stopped in Mysia, ruled by King Telephus. In the resulting battle, Achilles gave Telephus a wound that would not heal (according to a scholium to the Iliad, Dionysus was angry at Telephus for failing to worship him properly and tripped him with a grapevine to help Achilles wound him); Telephus consulted an oracle, who stated that "he that wounded shall heal". Guided by the oracle, he arrived at Argos, where Achilles healed him in order that he might become their guide for the voyage to Troy.

Philostratus reports that although Achilles wounded Telephus, it was Protesilaus who initially fought with Telephus and stripped him of his shield. Thus, when Achilles and Protesilaus contended over the spoils, the shield was awarded to Protesilaus.

According to other reports in Euripides's lost play about Telephus, he went to Aulis pretending to be a beggar and asked Achilles to heal his wound. Achilles refused, claiming to have no medical knowledge. Alternatively, Telephus held Orestes for ransom, the ransom being Achilles's aid in healing the wound. Odysseus reasoned that the spear had inflicted the wound; therefore, the spear must be able to heal it. Pieces of the spear were scraped off onto the wound and Telephus was healed.

=== Cycnus ===
One of the earliest opponents of Achilles during the Trojan War was Cycnus, an invulnerable son of Poseidon who had previously slain Protesilaus and a thousand others at Sigeion. Their duel is preserved mostly by Ovid's Metamorphoses, wherein the skin of Cycnus is unable to be pierced by either spear or sword. According to Pseudo-Apollodorus, he is slain when Achilles hurls a stone at his head, while Ovid has Achilles strangle Cycnus with his own helmet straps.

=== Troilus ===
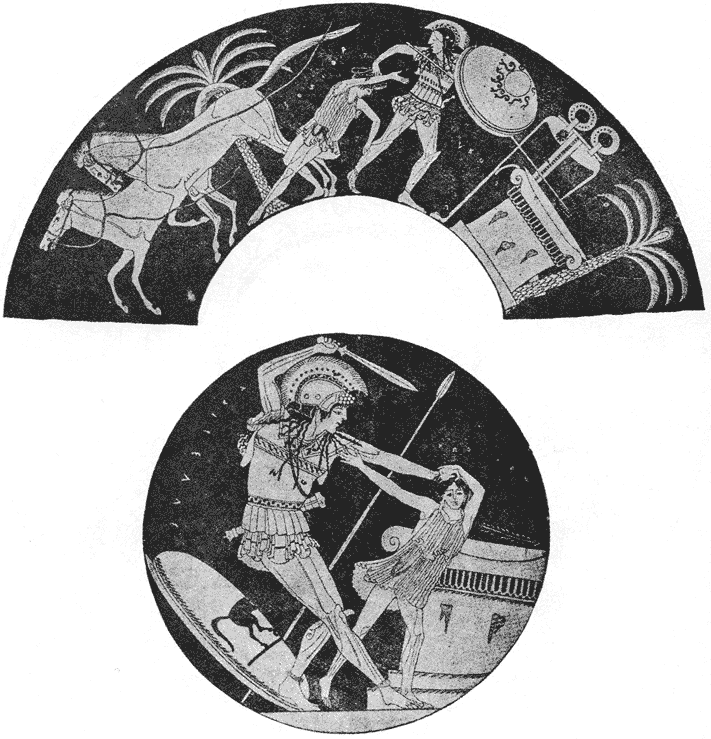
Achilles slaying Troilus, red-figure kylix signed by Euphronios

According to the Cypria (the part of the Epic Cycle that tells the events of the Trojan War before Achilles's wrath), when the Achaeans desired to return home, they were restrained by Achilles, who afterwards attacked the cattle of Aeneas, sacked neighbouring cities (such as Pedasus and Lyrnessus, where the Greeks capture the queen Briseis) and killed Tenes, a son of Apollo, as well as Priam's son Troilus in the sanctuary of Apollo Thymbraios; however, the romance between Troilus and Chryseis described in Geoffrey Chaucer's Troilus and Criseyde and in William Shakespeare's Troilus and Cressida is a medieval invention.

Achilles fighting Hector over an altar, with the head of Troilus on his spear; Attic black-figure amphora, 570–560 BC

In Dares Phrygius's Account of the Destruction of Troy, the Latin summary through which the story of Achilles was transmitted to medieval Europe, as well as in older accounts, Troilus was a young Trojan prince, the youngest of King Priam's and Hecuba's five legitimate sons (or according other sources, another son of Apollo). Despite his youth, he was one of the main Trojan war leaders, a "horse fighter" or "chariot fighter" according to Homer. Prophecies linked Troilus's fate to that of Troy and so he was ambushed in an attempt to capture him. Yet Achilles, struck by the beauty of both Troilus and his sister Polyxena, and overcome with lust, directed his sexual attentions on the youth—who, refusing to yield, instead found himself decapitated upon an altar-omphalos of Apollo Thymbraios. Later versions of the story suggested Troilus was accidentally killed by Achilles in an over-ardent lovers' embrace. In this version of the myth, Achilles's death therefore came in retribution for this sacrilege. Ancient writers treated Troilus as the epitome of a dead child mourned by his parents. Had Troilus lived to adulthood, the First Vatican Mythographer claimed, Troy would have been invincible; however, the motif is older and found already in Plautus's Bacchides.

=== In the Iliad ===
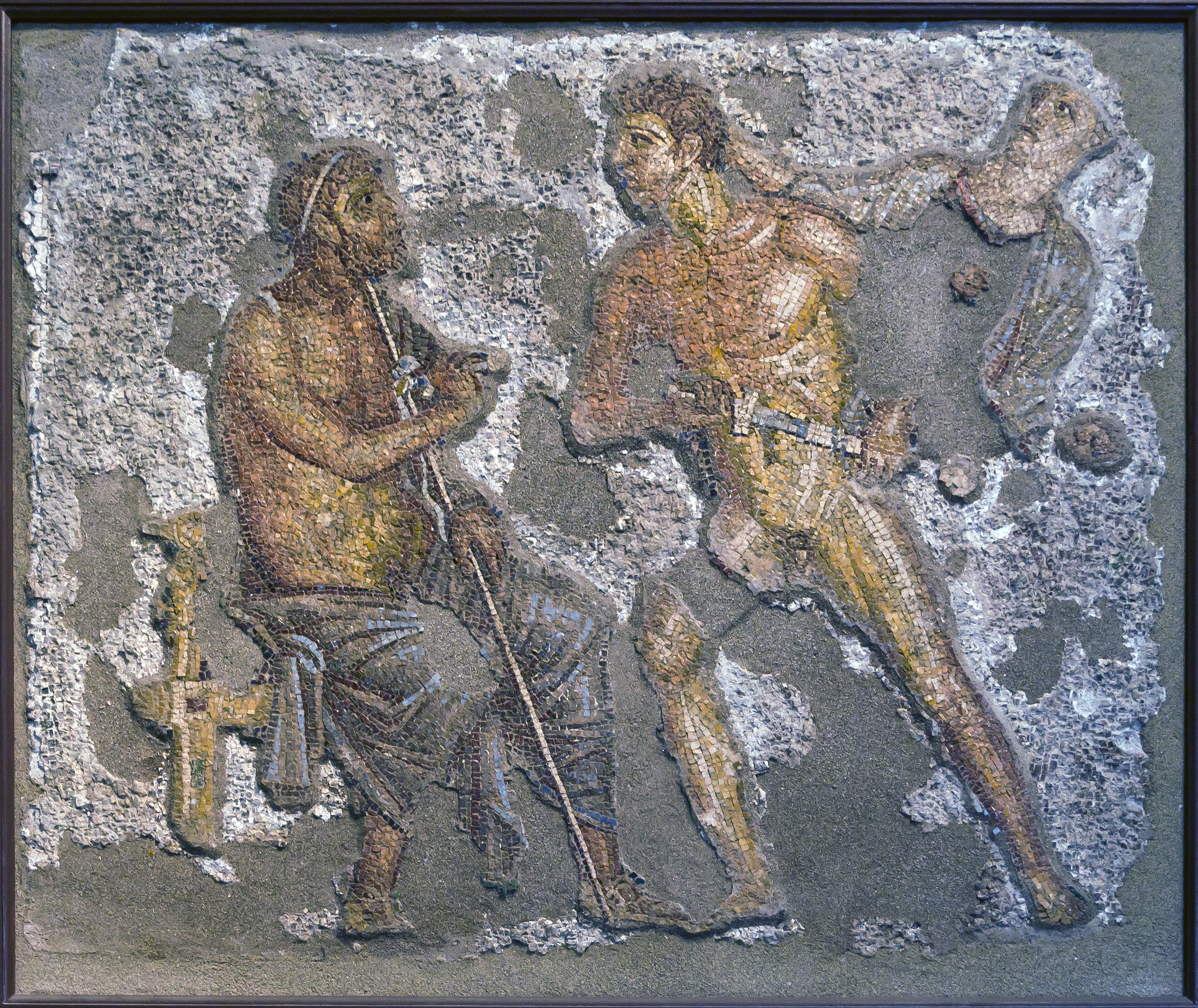
Achilles and Agamemnon, from a mosaic from Pompeii, first century AD

Homer's Iliad is the most famous narrative of Achilles's deeds in the Trojan War. Achilles's wrath (μῆνις Ἀχιλλέως, mênis Achilléōs) is the central theme of the poem. The first two lines of the Iliad read:

Μῆνιν ἄειδε θεὰ Πηληιάδεω Ἀχιλῆος οὐλομένην, ἣ μυρί' Ἀχαιοῖς ἄλγε' ἔθηκε, [...]	Sing, Goddess, of the rage of Peleus' son Achilles, the accursed rage that brought great suffering to the Achaeans, [...]

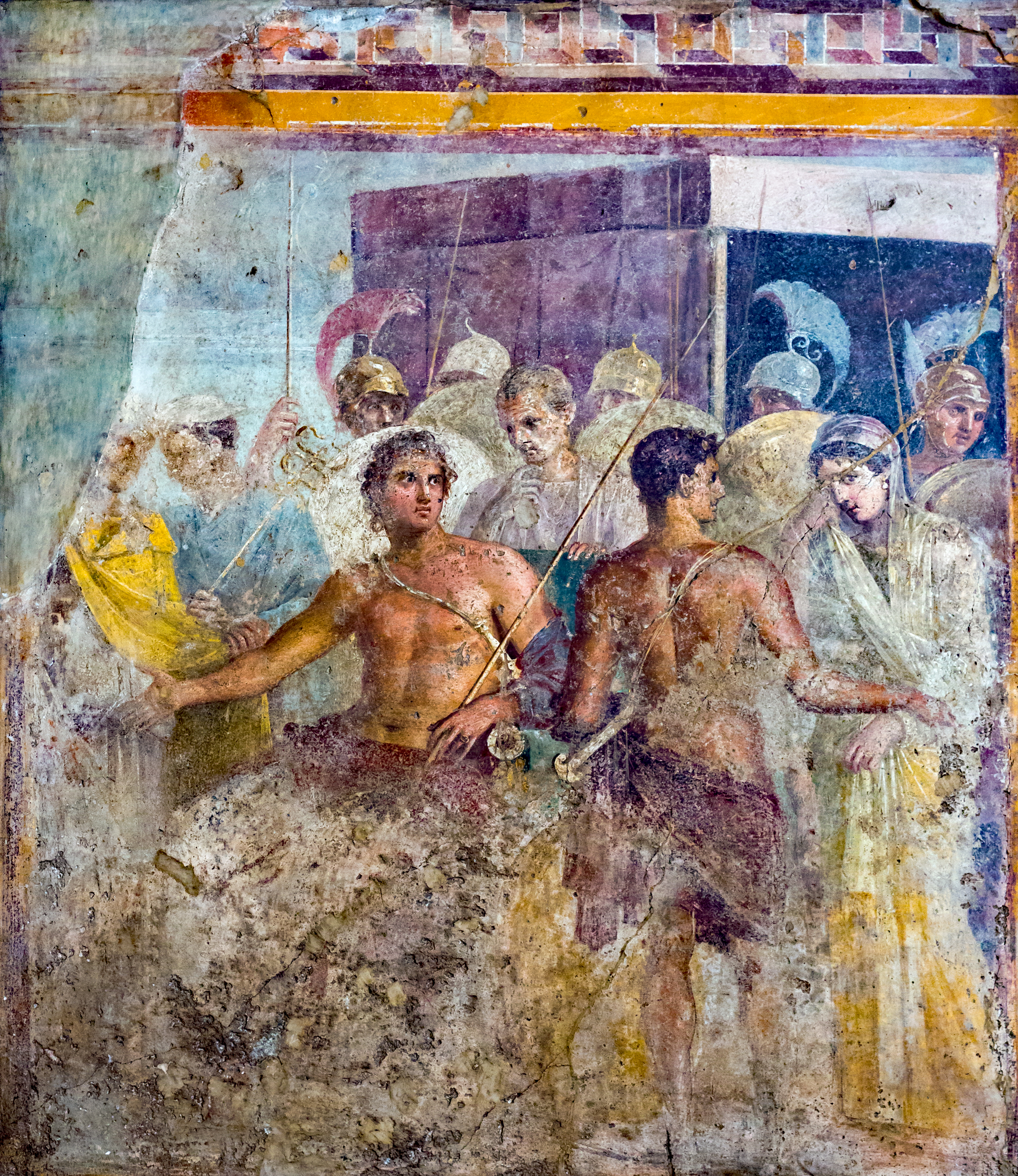
Achilles cedes Briseis to Agamemnon, from the House of the Tragic Poet in Pompeii, fresco, first century AD (Naples National Archaeological Museum)

The Homeric epic only covers a few weeks of the decade-long war, and does not narrate Achilles's death. It begins with Achilles's withdrawal from battle after being dishonoured by Agamemnon, the commander of the Achaean forces. Agamemnon has taken a woman named Chryseis as his slave. Her father Chryses, a priest of Apollo, begs Agamemnon to return her to him. Agamemnon refuses, and Apollo sends a plague amongst the Greeks. The prophet Calchas correctly determines the source of the troubles but will not speak unless Achilles vows to protect him. Achilles does so, and Calchas declares that Chryseis must be returned to her father. Agamemnon consents, but then commands that Achilles's slave Briseis, the daughter of Briseus, be brought to him to replace Chryseis. Angry at the dishonour of having his plunder and glory taken away (and, as he says later, because he loves Briseis), with the urging of his mother Thetis, Achilles refuses to fight or lead his troops alongside the other Greek forces. At the same time, burning with rage over Agamemnon's theft, Achilles prays to Thetis to convince Zeus to help the Trojans gain ground in the war, so that he may regain his honour.

As the battle turns against the Greeks, thanks to the influence of Zeus, Nestor declares that the Trojans are winning because Agamemnon has angered Achilles, and urges the king to appease the warrior. Agamemnon agrees and sends Odysseus and two other chieftains, Ajax and Phoenix. They promise that, if Achilles returns to battle, Agamemnon will return the captive Briseis and other gifts. Achilles rejects all Agamemnon offers him and simply urges the Greeks to sail home as he is planning to do.

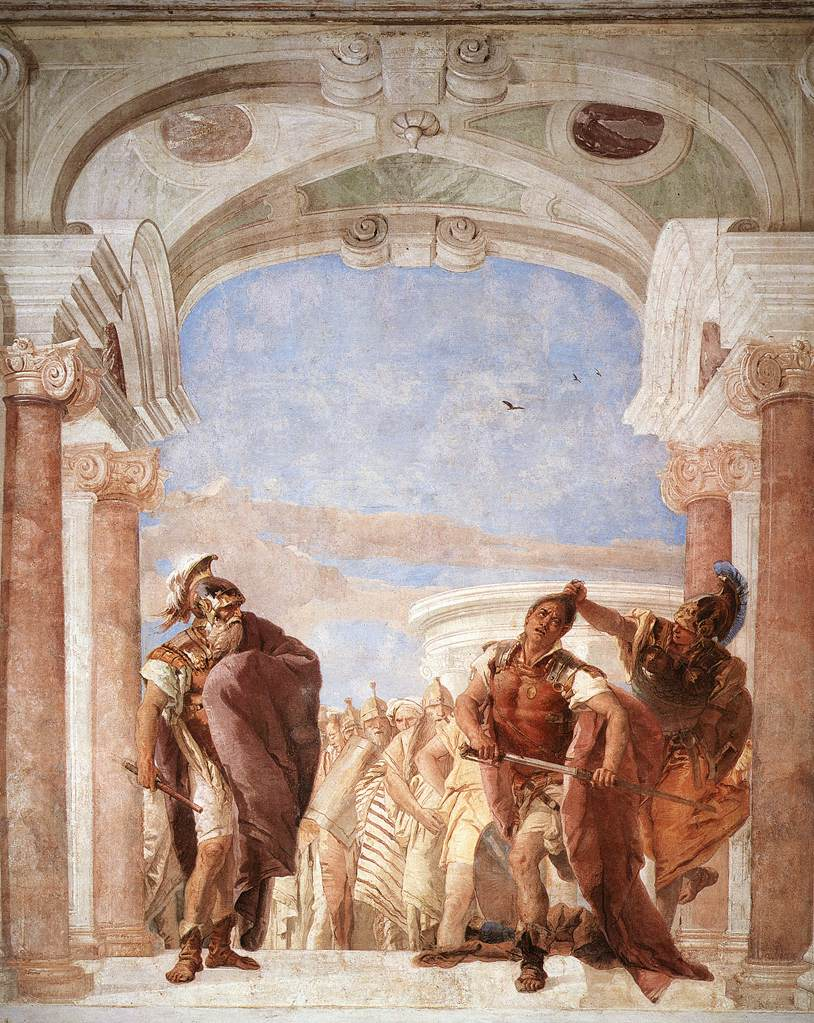
The Rage of Achilles, fresco by Giovanni Battista Tiepolo (1757, Villa Valmarana ai Nani, Vicenza)

The Trojans, led by Hector, subsequently push the Greek army back toward the beaches and assault the Greek ships. With the Greek forces on the verge of absolute destruction, Patroclus leads the Myrmidons into battle, wearing Achilles's armour, although Achilles remains at his camp. Patroclus succeeds in pushing the Trojans back from the beaches, but is killed by Hector before he can lead a proper assault on the city of Troy.

After receiving the news of the death of Patroclus from Antilochus, the son of Nestor, Achilles grieves over his beloved companion's death. His mother Thetis comes to comfort the distraught Achilles. She persuades Hephaestus to make new armour for him, in place of the armour that Patroclus had been wearing, which was taken by Hector. The new armour includes the Shield of Achilles, described in great detail in the poem.

Enraged over the death of Patroclus, Achilles ends his refusal to fight and takes the field, killing many men in his rage but always seeking out Hector. Achilles even engages in battle with the river god Scamander, who has become angry that Achilles is choking his waters with all the men he has killed. The god tries to drown Achilles but is stopped by Hera and Hephaestus. Zeus himself takes note of Achilles's rage and sends the gods to restrain him so that he will not go on to sack Troy itself before the time allotted for its destruction, seeming to show that the unhindered rage of Achilles can defy fate itself. Finally, Achilles finds his prey.

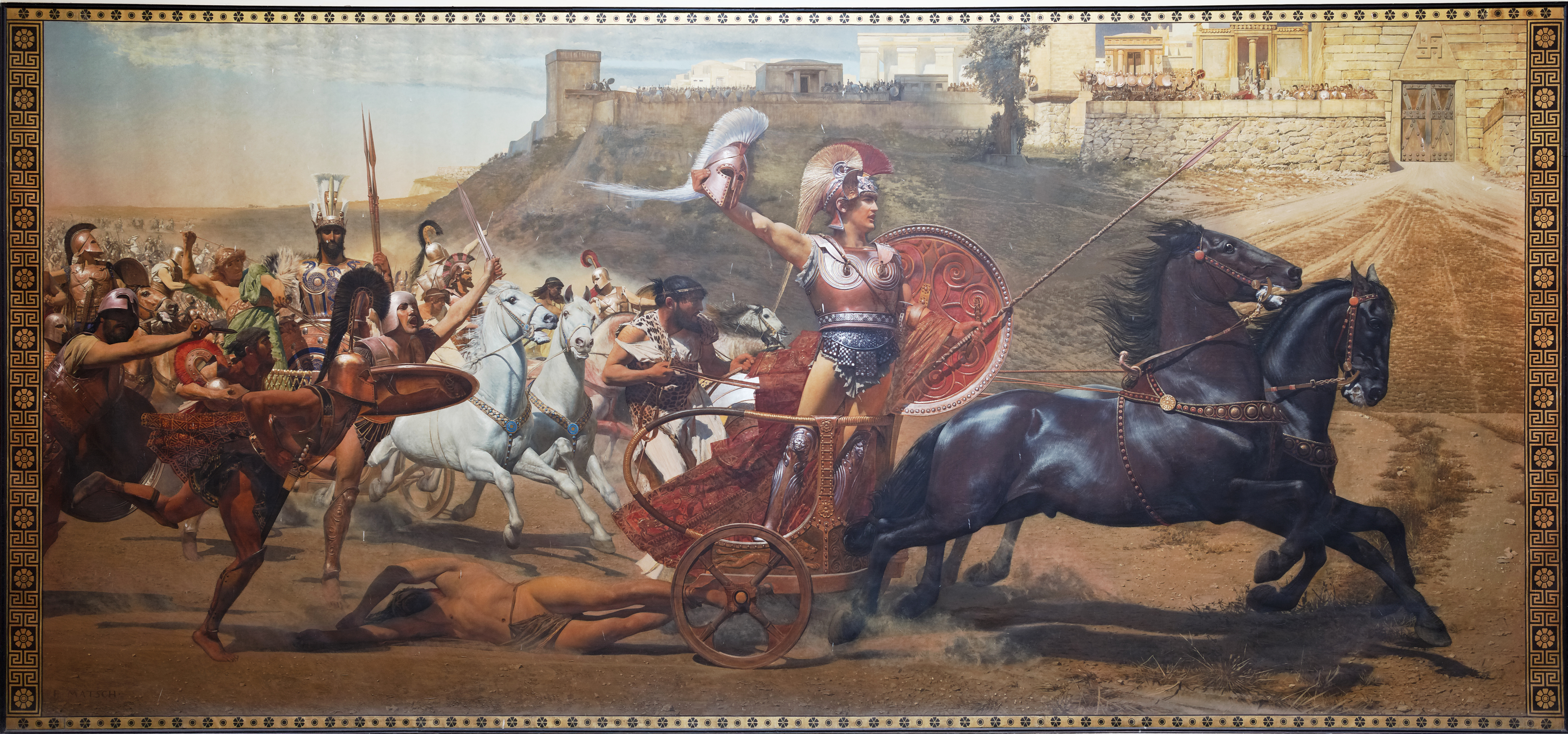
The Triumph of Achilles, fresco by Franz von Matsch in the Achilleion, Greece

Achilles chases Hector around the wall of Troy three times before Athena, in the form of Hector's favourite and dearest brother, Deiphobus, persuades Hector to stop running and fight Achilles face to face. After Hector realizes the trick, he knows the battle is inevitable. Wanting to go down fighting, he charges at Achilles with his only weapon, his sword, but misses. Accepting his fate, Hector begs Achilles not to spare his life, but to treat his body with respect after killing him. Achilles tells Hector it is hopeless to expect that of him, declaring that, "my rage, my fury would drive me now to hack your flesh away and eat you raw – such agonies you have caused me." Achilles then kills Hector and drags his corpse by its heels behind his chariot. After having a dream where Patroclus begs Achilles to hold his funeral, Achilles hosts a series of funeral games in honour of his companion.

At the onset of his duel with Hector, Achilles is referred to as the brightest star in the sky, which comes on in the autumn, Orion's dog (Sirius); a sign of evil. During the cremation of Patroclus, he is compared to Hesperus, the evening/western star (Venus), while the burning of the funeral pyre lasts until Phosphorus, the morning/eastern star (also Venus) has set (descended).

With the assistance of the god Hermes (Argeiphontes), Hector's father Priam goes to Achilles's tent to plead with Achilles for the return of Hector's body so that he can be buried. Achilles relents and promises a truce for the duration of the funeral, lasting 9 days with a burial on the 10th (in the tradition of Niobe's offspring). The poem ends with a description of Hector's funeral, with the doom of Troy and Achilles himself still to come.

=== Penthesilea and Memnon ===
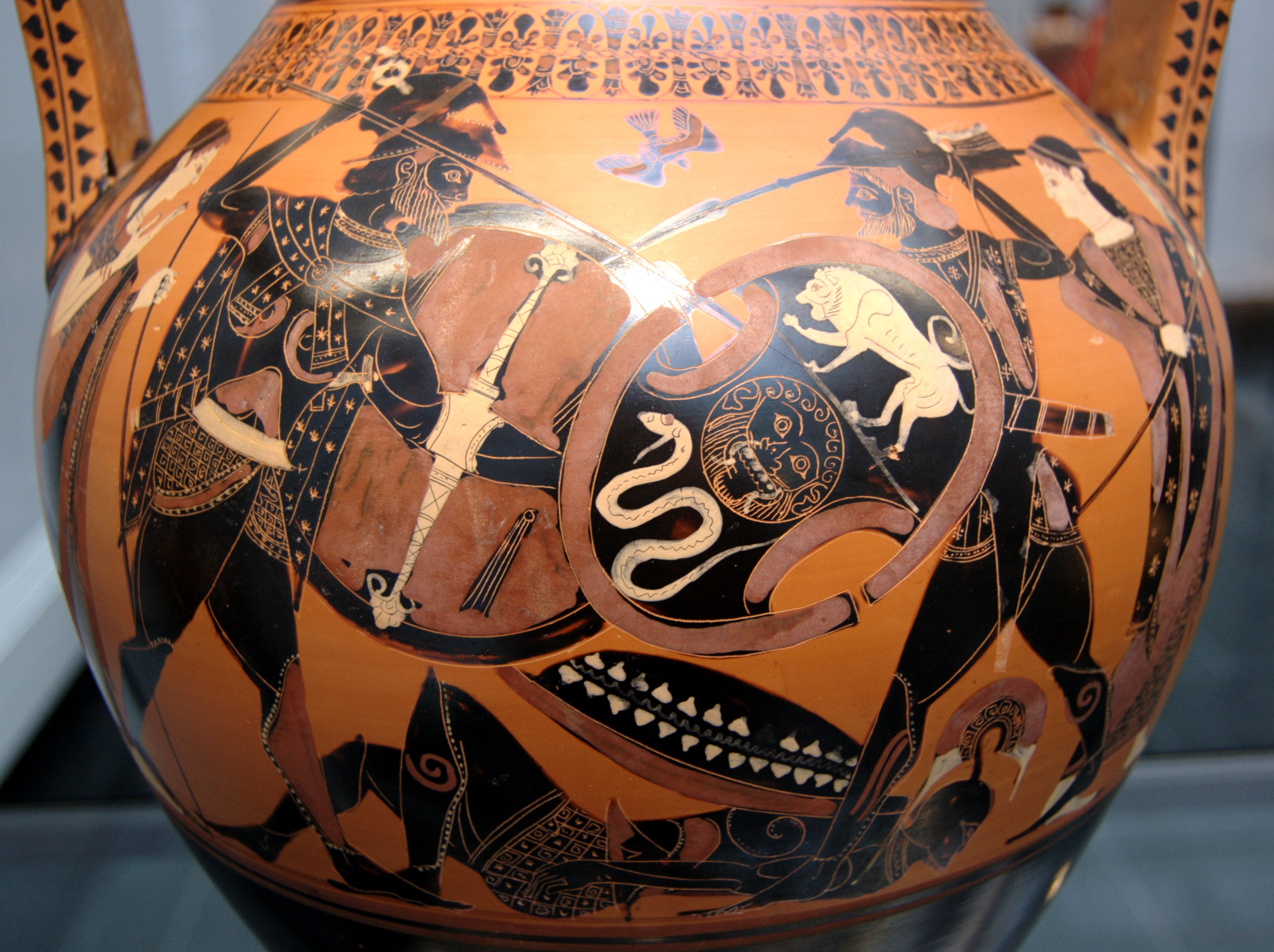
Achilles and Memnon fighting, between Thetis and Eos, Attic black-figure amphora, c. 510 BC, from Vulci

Later works, including the Aethiopis (seventh century BC) and a work named Posthomerica, composed by Quintus of Smyrna in the fourth century AD, relate further events from the Trojan War. When Penthesilea, queen of the Amazons and daughter of Ares, arrives in Troy, Priam hopes that she will defeat Achilles. After his temporary truce with Priam, Achilles fights and kills the warrior queen, only to grieve over her death later. Thersites mocks Achilles over this grief, and is murdered by him as a result, earning the ire of Thersites' cousin, Diomedes. Because of this, Achilles is forced to sail to Lesbos and make sacrifices to Apollo, Artemis, and Leto, before he can be purified of the murder by Odysseus.

Following the death of Patroclus, Nestor's son Antilochus becomes Achilles's closest companion. Achilles already loved Antilochus, so Menelaus thought Antilochus would be the best person to inform Achilles of Patroclus's death. Later, Memnon, son of the Dawn Goddess Eos and king of Ethiopia, slays Antilochus as he sacrifices himself to save his father. According to Philostratus's Imagines, Achilles laments his death on the battlefield, promising Antilochus a glorious funeral and vengeance. Achilles once more obtains revenge on the battlefield, killing Memnon. Consequently, Eos will not let the sun rise until Zeus persuades her. The fight between Achilles and Memnon over Antilochus echoes that of Achilles and Hector over Patroclus, except that Memnon (unlike Hector) was also the son of a goddess.

Many Homeric scholars argued that episode inspired many details in the Iliad's description of the death of Patroclus and Achilles's reaction to it. The episode then formed the basis of the cyclic epic Aethiopis, which was composed after the Iliad, possibly in the seventh century BC. The Aethiopis is now lost, except for scattered fragments quoted by later authors.

=== Achilles and Patroclus ===
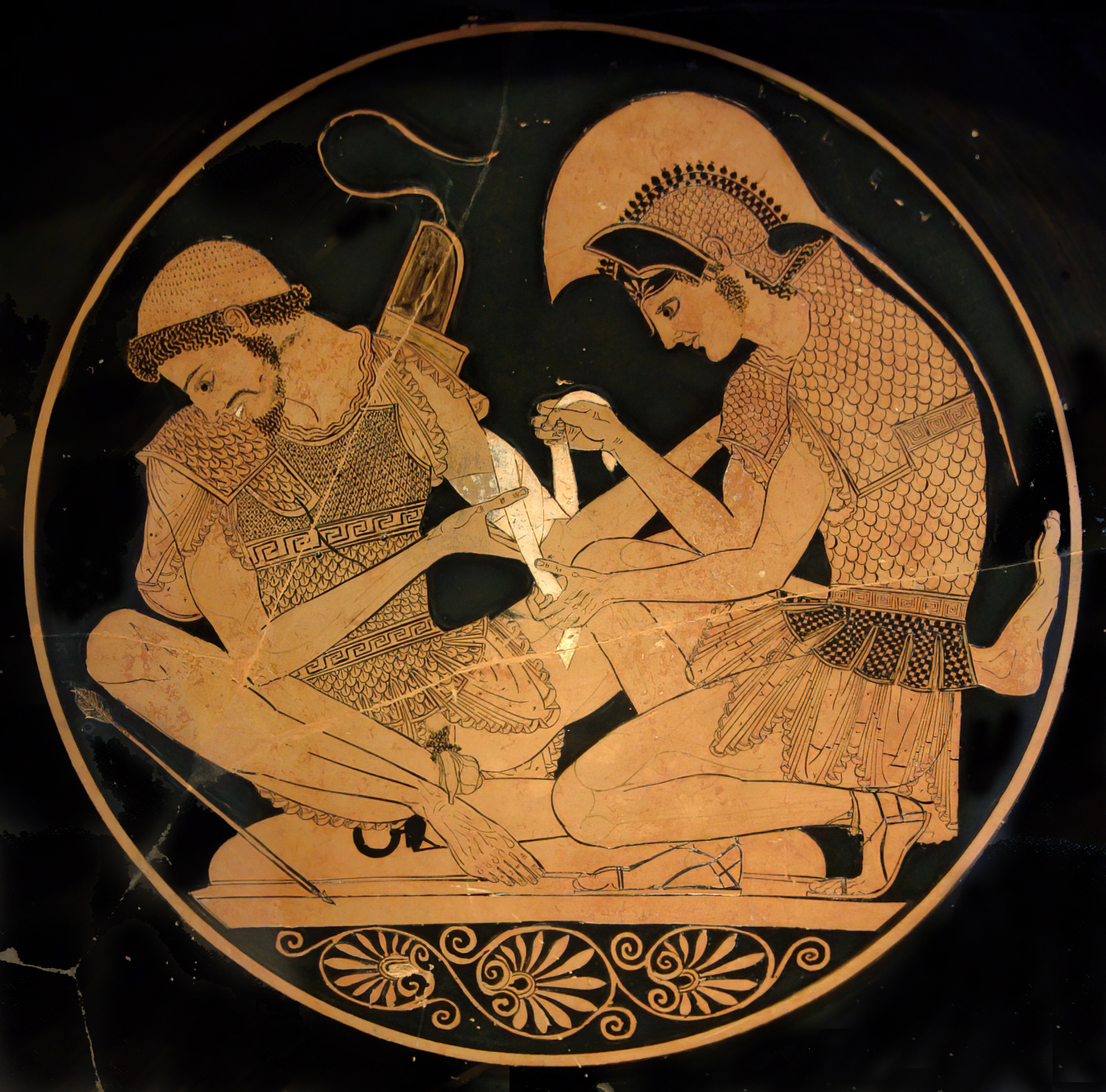
Achilles tending Patroclus wounded by an arrow, Attic red-figure kylix, c. 500 BC (Altes Museum, Berlin)

The exact nature of Achilles's relationship with Patroclus has been a subject of dispute in both the classical period and modern times. In the Iliad, it appears to be the model of a deep and loyal friendship. Homer does not suggest that Achilles and his close friend Patroclus had sexual relations. Although there is no evidence in the text of the Iliad that Achilles and Patroclus were lovers, this theory was expressed by some later authors. Commentators from classical antiquity to the present have often interpreted the relationship through the lens of their own cultures. In fifth-century BC Athens, the intense bond was often viewed in light of the Greek custom of paiderasteia, which is the relationship between an older male and a younger one, usually a teenager. In Plato's Symposium, the participants in a dialogue about love assume that Achilles and Patroclus were a couple; Phaedrus argues that Achilles was the younger and more beautiful one so he was the beloved and Patroclus was the lover. In Xenophon's Symposium, Socrates says that Achilles and Patroclus were not lovers but had a platonic relationship. Kenneth Dover argues that ancient Greek had no words to distinguish heterosexual and homosexual, and it was assumed that a man could both desire handsome young men and have sex with women. However, some ancient Greek texts did recognize that certain men have exclusive preference for other men by nature but only marry women and beget children out of compulsion or custom while others always seek women. Many pairs of men throughout history have been compared to Achilles and Patroclus to imply a homosexual relationship. Bernard Knox viewed Patroclus as the anchor of Achilles' suppressed humanity, serving as a compassionate bridge that connects the isolated, godlike warrior to the mortal world of empathy and community. While Knox maintains that Homer originally depicted their bond as an intense, heroic friendship (philia) rather than an erotic romance, it stands out as the most profound relationship in the epic. It is the death of Patroclus that shatters Achilles' selfish pride, forcing him to confront the devastating consequences of his actions and launching his painful evolution toward reclaiming his own humanity. The pain of losing Patroclus is what ultimately leads to Achilles' showing mercy to Priam, allowing him to bury the body of his son Hector.

=== Death ===
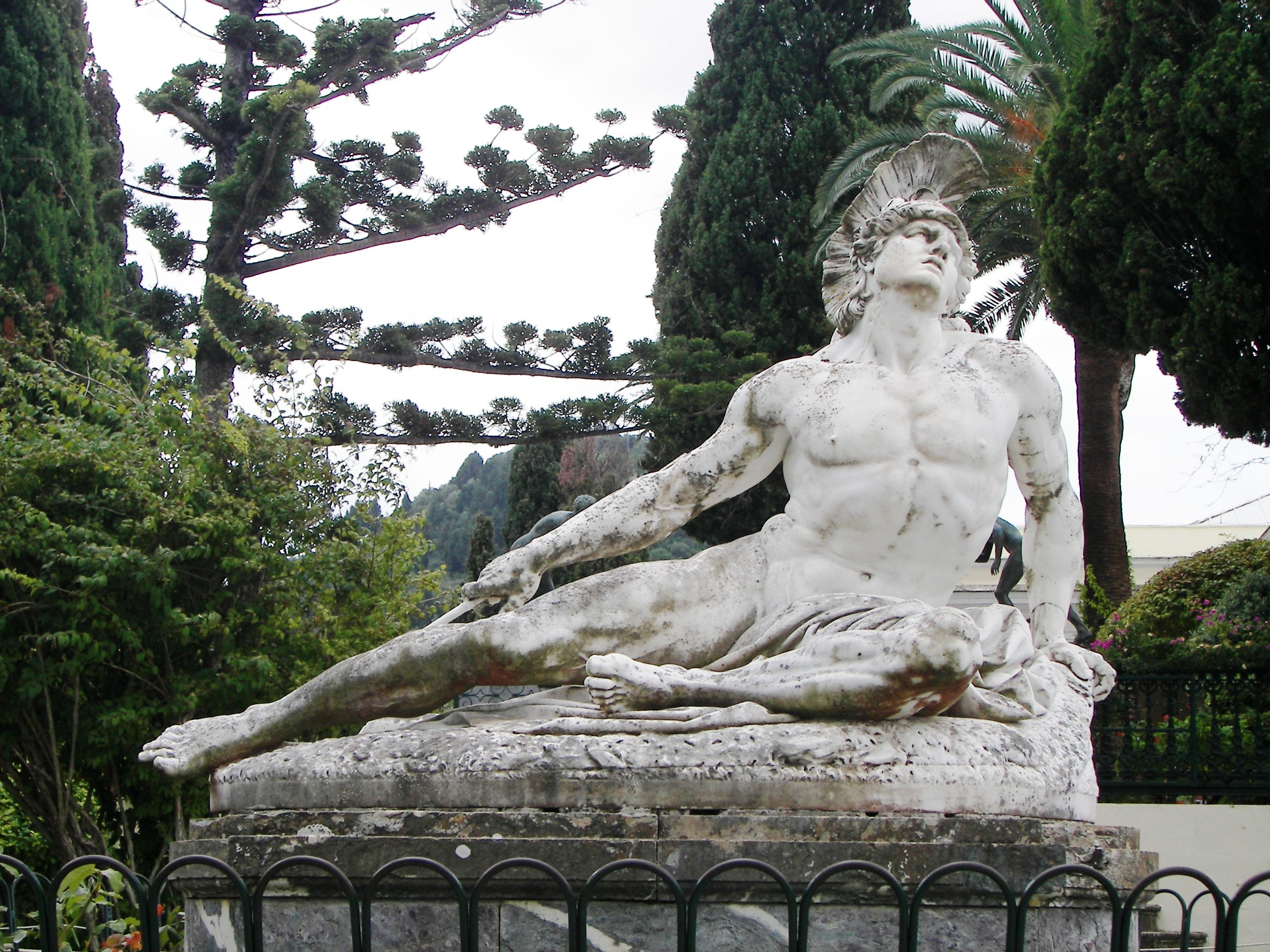
Dying Achilles (Achilleas thniskon) in the gardens of the Achilleion

The death of Achilles, even if considered solely as it occurred in the oldest sources, is a complex one, with many different versions. Starting with the oldest account in book 22 of the Iliad, Hector predicts with his last dying breath that Paris and Apollo will slay him at the Scaean Gates leading to Troy (with an arrow to the heel according to Statius). In book 23, the sad spirit of dead Patroclus visits Achilles just as he drifts off into slumber, requesting that his bones be placed with those of Achilles in his golden vase, a gift of his mother.

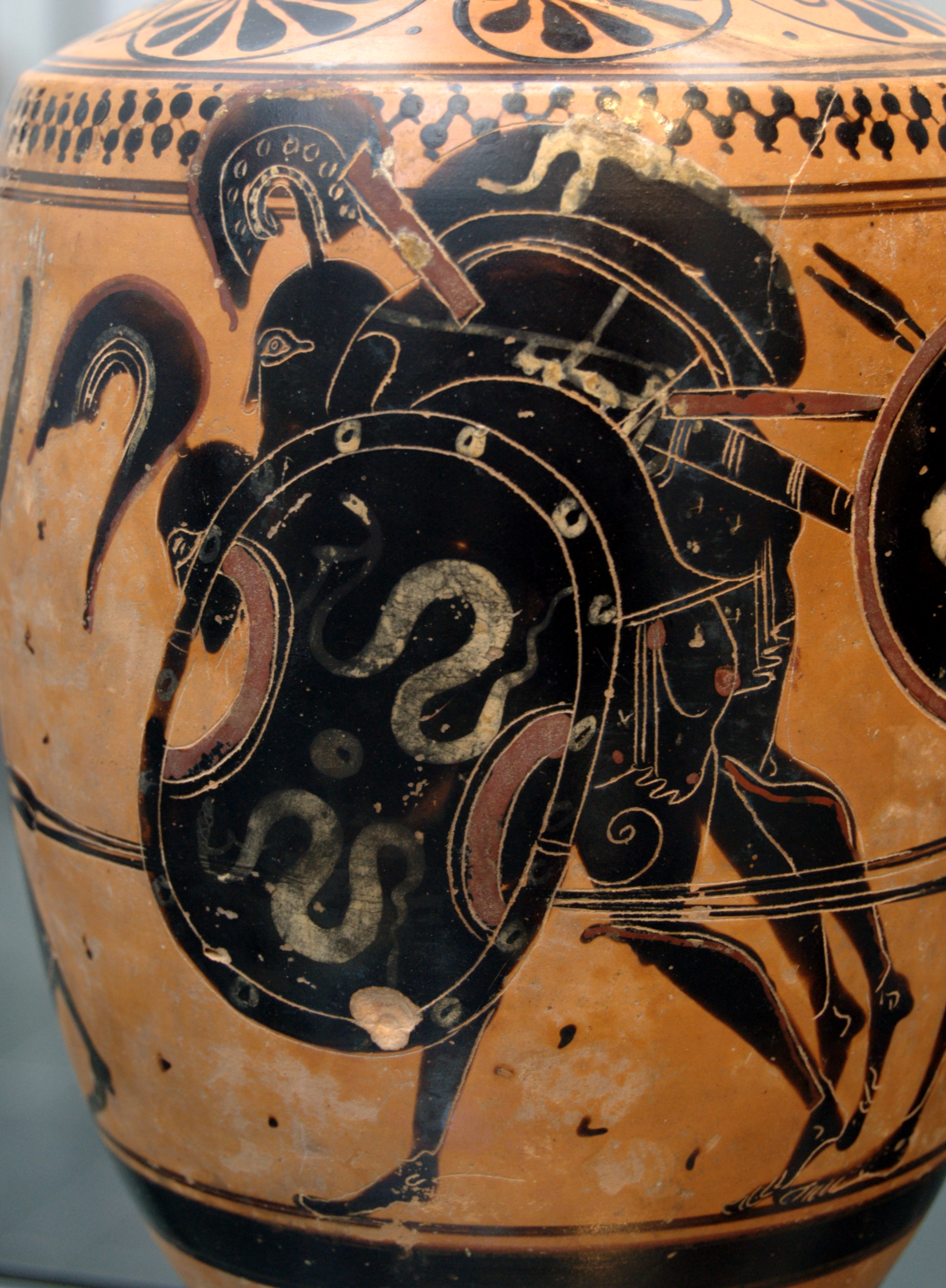
Ajax carries off the body of Achilles, Attic black-figure lekythos from Sicily, c. 510 BC (Staatliche Antikensammlungen, Munich).

In book 11 of the Odyssey, Odysseus sails to the underworld and converses with the shades. One of these is Achilles, who when greeted as "blessed in life, blessed in death", responds that he would rather be a slave to the worst of masters than be king of all the dead. But Achilles then asks Odysseus of his son's exploits in the Trojan war, and Odysseus tells him of Neoptolemus's actions.

Book 24 of Odyssey gives dead King Agamemnon's ghostly account of Achilles's death: the bleached bones from Achilles's funeral pyre had been mixed with those of Patroclus and put into his mother's golden vase. Also, the bones of Antilochus, who had become closer to Achilles than any other following Patroclus's death, were separately enclosed. The customary funeral games of a hero were performed, and a massive tomb or mound was built on the Hellespont for approaching seagoers to celebrate.

Achilles was represented in the Aethiopis as living after his death in the island of Leuke at the mouth of the river Danube. Another version of Achilles's death is that he fell deeply in love with one of the Trojan princesses, Polyxena. Achilles asks Priam for Polyxena's hand in marriage. Priam is willing because it would mean the end of the war and an alliance with the world's greatest warrior. But while Priam is overseeing the private marriage of Polyxena and Achilles, Paris, who would have to give up Helen if Achilles married his sister, hides in the bushes and shoots Achilles with a divine arrow, killing him. According to Apollodorus, after his death he married Medea in the Elysian Fields.

=== Fate of Achilles's armour ===
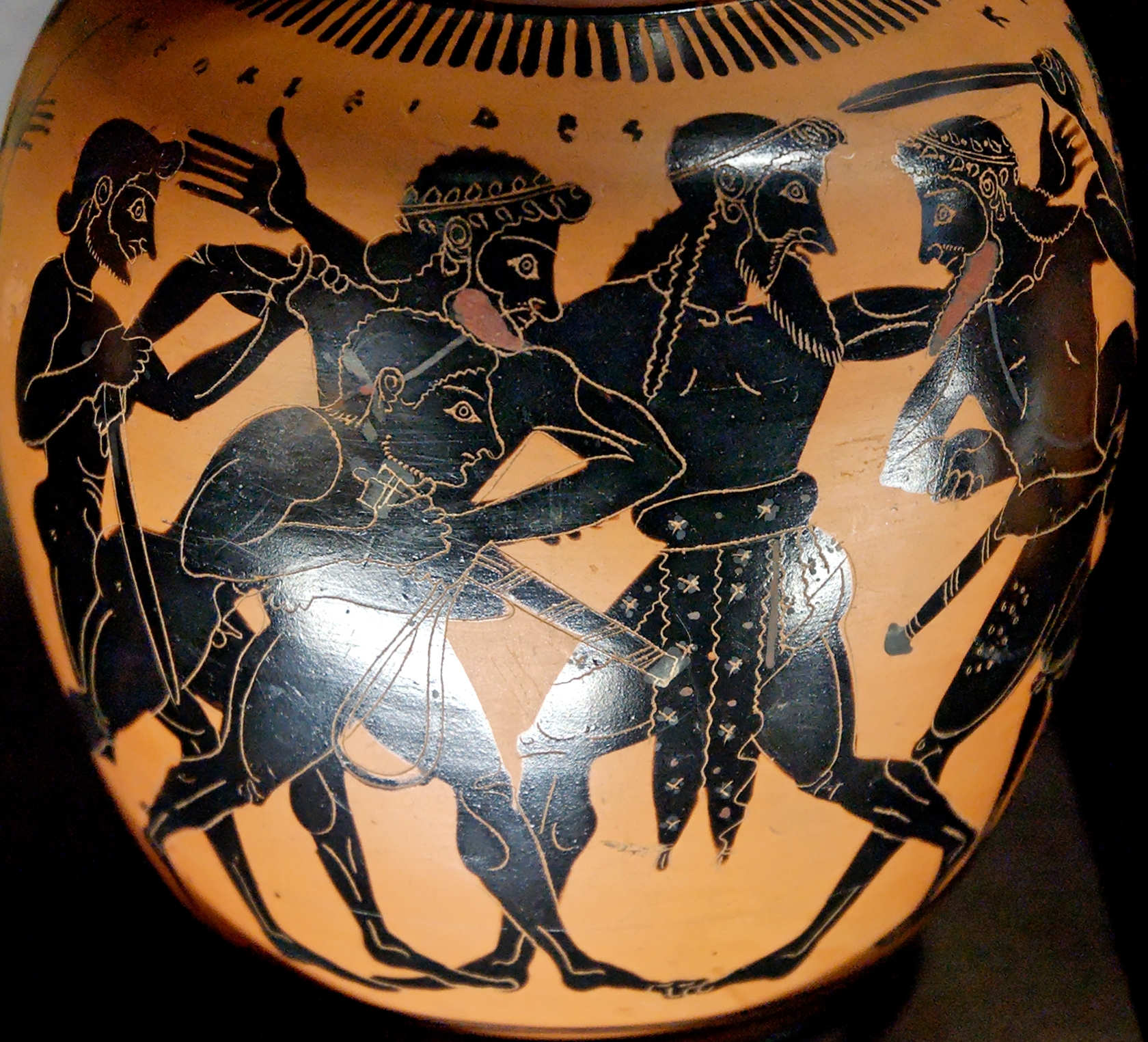
Oinochoe, c. 520 BC, Ajax and Odysseus fighting over the armour of Achilles

Achilles's armour was the object of a feud between Odysseus and Ajax the Great. They competed for it by giving speeches on why they were the bravest after Achilles to their Trojan prisoners, who, after considering the presentations of both men, decided Odysseus was more deserving of the armour. Furious, Ajax cursed Odysseus, which earned him the ire of Athena, who temporarily made Ajax so mad with grief and anguish that he began killing sheep, thinking them his comrades. After a while, when Athena lifted his madness and Ajax realized that he had actually been killing sheep, he was so ashamed that he committed suicide. Odysseus eventually gave the armour to Neoptolemus, the son of Achilles. When Odysseus encounters the shade of Ajax much later in the House of Hades (Odyssey 11.543–566), Ajax is still so angry about the outcome of the competition that he refuses to speak to Odysseus.

The armour they fought for was made by Hephaestus and thus much stronger and more beautiful than any armour a mortal could craft. Thetis had the gear made for Achilles because his first set was worn by Patroclus when he went to battle and taken by Hector when he killed Patroclus. The Shield of Achilles was also made by the fire god. His legendary spear was given to him by his mentor Chiron before he participated in the Trojan War. It was called the Pelian Spear, which allegedly no other man could wield.

A relic claimed to be Achilles's bronze-headed spear was preserved for centuries in the temple of Athena on the acropolis of Phaselis, Lycia, a port on the Pamphylian Gulf. The city was visited in 333 BC by Alexander the Great, who envisioned himself as the new Achilles and carried the Iliad with him, but his court biographers do not mention the spear; however, it was shown in the time of Pausanias in the second century AD.

=== Achilles, Ajax and a game of petteia ===
Numerous paintings on pottery have suggested a tale not mentioned in the literary traditions. At some point in the war, Achilles and Ajax were playing a board game (petteia). They were absorbed in the game and oblivious to the surrounding battle. The Trojans attacked and reached the heroes, who were saved only by an intervention of Athena.

== Worship and heroic cult ==
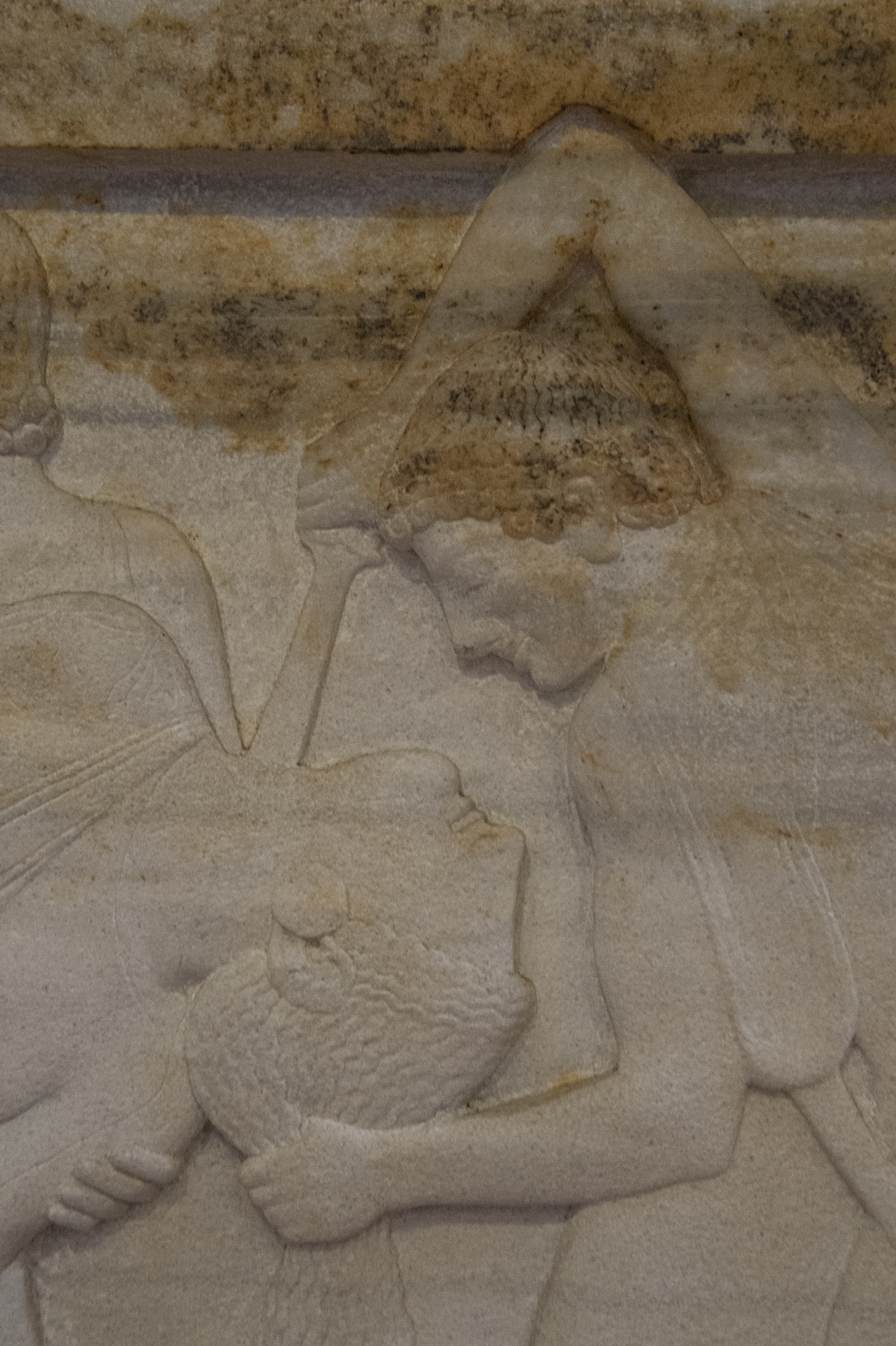
Sacrifice of Polyxena and tumulus-shaped tomb of Achilles with a tripod in front, on the Polyxena sarcophagus, c. 500 BC

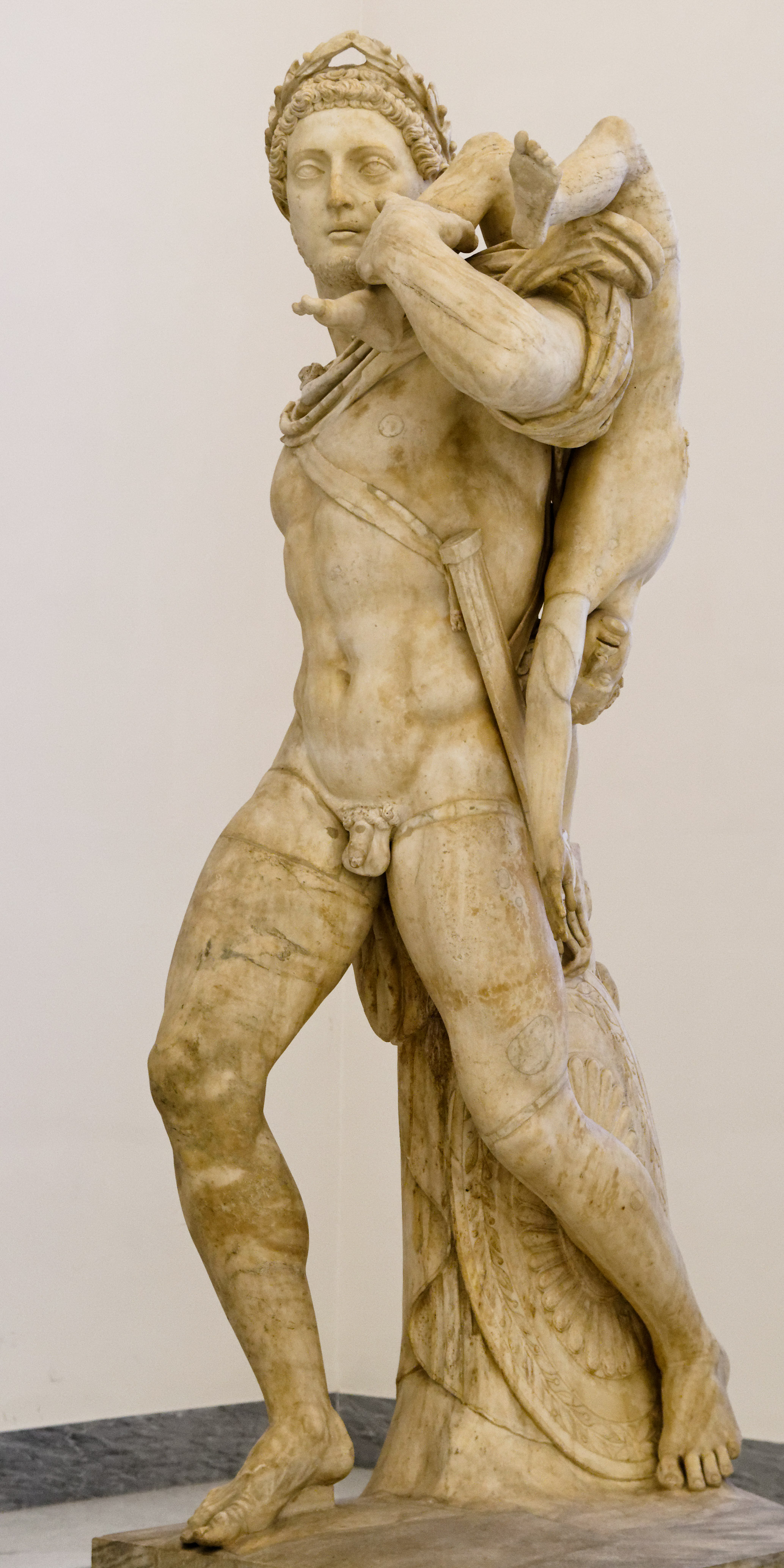
Roman statue of a man with the dead body of a boy, identified as Achilles and Troilus, second century AD (Naples National Archaeological Museum)

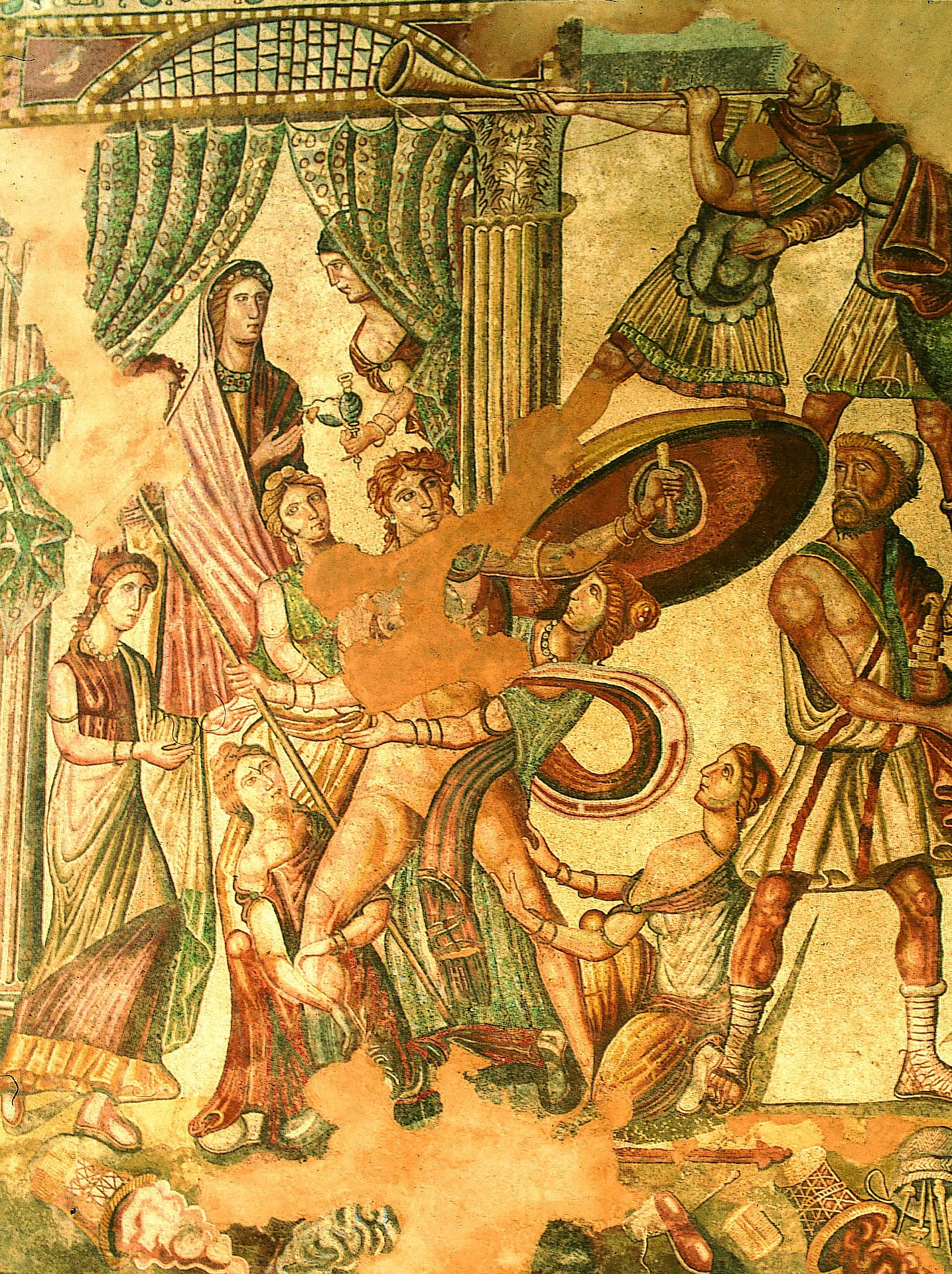
Achilles on Skyros, where—according to the Achilleid—Odysseus discovers him dressed as a woman and hiding among the princesses of the royal court, late Roman mosaic from La Olmeda, Spain, fourth–fifth centuries AD

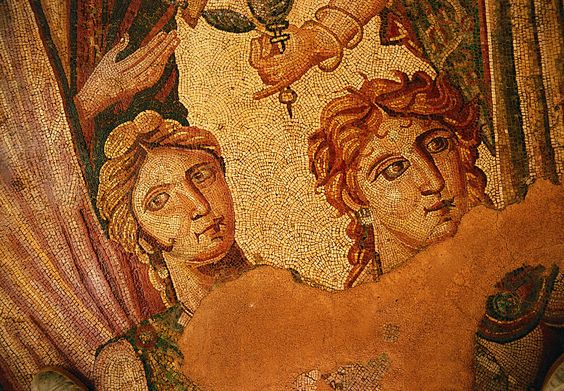
Detail of Achilles

The tomb of Achilles, extant throughout antiquity in the Troad, was venerated by Thessalians, but also by Persian expeditionary forces, as well as by Alexander the Great and the Roman emperor Caracalla. Achilles's cult was also to be found at other places, e. g. on the island of Astypalaea in the Sporades, in Sparta which had a sanctuary, in Elis and in Achilles's homeland Thessaly, as well as in the Magna Graecia cities of Tarentum, Locri and Croton, accounting for an almost Panhellenic cult to the hero.

The cult of Achilles is illustrated in the Polyxena sarcophagus (500 BC), which depicts the sacrifice of Polyxena near the tumulus of Achilles. Strabo (13.1.32) also suggested that such a cult of Achilles existed in Troad:

Near the Sigeium is a temple and monument of Achilles, and monuments also of Patroclus and Anthlochus. The Ilienses perform sacred ceremonies in honour of them all, and even of Ajax. But they do not worship Hercules, alleging as a reason that he ravaged their country.

— Strabo (13.1.32)

The spread and intensity of the hero's veneration among the Greeks that had settled on the northern coast of the Pontus Euxinus, today's Black Sea, appears to have been remarkable. An archaic cult is attested for the Milesian colony of Olbia as well as for an island in the middle of the Black Sea, today identified with Snake Island (Ukrainian: Зміїний, Zmiinyi, near Kiliia, Ukraine). Early dedicatory inscriptions from the Greek colonies on the Black Sea (graffiti and inscribed clay disks, these possibly being votive offerings, from Olbia, the area of Berezan Island and the Tauric Chersonese) attest the existence of a heroic cult of Achilles from the sixth century BC onwards. The cult was still thriving in the third century AD, when dedicatory stelae from Olbia refer to an Achilles Pontárchēs (Ποντάρχης, roughly 'lord of the sea', or 'lord of the Pontus Euxinus'), who was invoked as a protector of the city of Olbia, venerated on par with Olympian gods such as the local Apollo Prostates, Hermes Agoraeus, or Poseidon.

Pliny the Elder (23–79 AD) in his Natural History mentions a "port of the Achæi" and an "island of Achilles", famous for the tomb of that "man" (portus Achaeorum, insula Achillis, tumulo eius viri clara), situated somewhat nearby Olbia and the Dnieper-Bug Estuary; furthermore, at 125 Roman miles from this island, he places a peninsula "which stretches forth in the shape of a sword" obliquely, called Dromos Achilleos (Ἀχιλλέως δρόμος, Achilléōs drómos, 'the Race-course of Achilles') and considered the place of the hero's exercise or of games instituted by him. This last feature of Pliny's account is considered to be the iconic spit, called today Tendra (or Kosa Tendra and Kosa Djarilgatch), situated between the mouth of the Dnieper and Karkinit Bay, but which is hardly 125 Roman miles (around 185 km) away from the Dnieper-Bug estuary, as Pliny states (to the "Race-course" he gives a length of 80 miles (130 km), whereas the spit measures around 70 km (43 mi) today).

In the following chapter of his book, Pliny refers to the same island as Achillea and introduces two further names for it: Leuce or Macaron (from Greek [νῆσος] μακαρῶν, 'island of the blest'). The "present day" measures, he gives at this point, seem to account for an identification of Achillea or Leuce with today's Snake Island. Pliny's contemporary Pomponius Mela (c. 43 AD) tells that Achilles was buried on an island named Achillea, situated between the Borysthenes and the Ister, adding to the geographical confusion. Ruins of a square temple, measuring 30 meters to a side, possibly that dedicated to Achilles, were discovered by Captain Nikolay Kritsky in 1823 on Snake Island. A second exploration in 1840 showed that the construction of a lighthouse had destroyed all traces of this temple. A fifth-century BC black-glazed lekythos inscription, found on the island in 1840, reads: "Glaukos, son of Poseidon, dedicated me to Achilles, lord of Leuke." In another inscription from the fifth or fourth centuries BC, a statue is dedicated to Achilles, lord of Leuke, by a citizen of Olbia, while in a further dedication, the city of Olbia confirms its continuous maintenance of the island's cult, again suggesting its quality as a place of a supra-regional hero veneration.

The heroic cult dedicated to Achilles on Leuce seems to go back to an account from the lost epic Aethiopis according to which, after his untimely death, Thetis had snatched her son from the funeral pyre and removed him to a mythical Λεύκη Νῆσος (Leúkē Nêsos, 'White Island'). Already in the fifth century BC, Pindar had mentioned a cult of Achilles on a "bright island" (φαεννά νᾶσος, phaenná nâsos) of the Black Sea, while in another of his works, Pindar would retell the story of the immortalized Achilles living on a geographically indefinite Island of the Blest together with other heroes such as his father Peleus and Cadmus. Well known is the connection of these mythological Fortunate Isles (μακαρῶν νῆσοι, makárôn nêsoi) or the Homeric Elysium with the stream Oceanus which according to Greek mythology surrounds the inhabited world, which should have accounted for the identification of the northern strands of the Euxine with it. Guy Hedreen has found further evidence for this connection of Achilles with the northern margin of the inhabited world in a poem by Alcaeus, speaking of "Achilles lord of Scythia" and the opposition of North and South, as evoked by Achilles's fight against the Aethiopian prince Memnon, who in his turn would be removed to his homeland by his mother Eos after his death.

The Periplus of the Euxine Sea (c. 130 AD) gives the following details:

It is said that the goddess Thetis raised this island from the sea, for her son Achilles, who dwells there. Here is his temple and his statue, an archaic work. This island is not inhabited, and goats graze on it, not many, which the people who happen to arrive here with their ships, sacrifice to Achilles. In this temple are also deposited a great many holy gifts, craters, rings and precious stones, offered to Achilles in gratitude. One can still read inscriptions in Greek and Latin, in which Achilles is praised and celebrated. Some of these are worded in Patroclus's honour, because those who wish to be favored by Achilles, honour Patroclus at the same time. There are also in this island countless numbers of sea birds, which look after Achilles's temple. Every morning they fly out to sea, wet their wings with water, and return quickly to the temple and sprinkle it. And after they finish the sprinkling, they clean the hearth of the temple with their wings. Other people say still more, that some of the men who reach this island, come here intentionally. They bring animals in their ships, destined to be sacrificed. Some of these animals they slaughter, others they set free on the island, in Achilles's honour. But there are others, who are forced to come to this island by sea storms. As they have no sacrificial animals, but wish to get them from the god of the island himself, they consult Achilles's oracle. They ask permission to slaughter the victims chosen from among the animals that graze freely on the island, and to deposit in exchange the price which they consider fair. But in case the oracle denies them permission, because there is an oracle here, they add something to the price offered, and if the oracle refuses again, they add something more, until at last, the oracle agrees that the price is sufficient. And then the victim doesn't run away any more, but waits willingly to be caught. So, there is a great quantity of silver there, consecrated to the hero, as price for the sacrificial victims. To some of the people who come to this island, Achilles appears in dreams, to others he would appear even during their navigation, if they were not too far away, and would instruct them as to which part of the island they would better anchor their ships.

The Greek geographer Dionysius Periegetes, who probably lived during the first century AD, wrote that the island was called Leuce "because the wild animals which live there are white. It is said that there, in Leuce island, reside the souls of Achilles and other heroes, and that they wander through the uninhabited valleys of this island; this is how Jove rewarded the men who had distinguished themselves through their virtues, because through virtue they had acquired everlasting honour." Similarly, others relate the island's name to its white cliffs, snakes or birds dwelling there. Pausanias has been told that the island is "covered with forests and full of animals, some wild, some tame. In this island there is also Achilles's temple and his statue." Leuce had also a reputation as a place of healing. Pausanias reports that the Delphic Pythia sent a lord of Croton to be cured of a chest wound. Ammianus Marcellinus attributes the healing to waters (aquae) on the island.

Strabo mentioned that the cape of the Racecourse of Achilles was sacred to Achilles and although it was treeless, was called Alsos (ἄλσος). Alsos in Greek means 'grove'.

A number of important commercial port cities of the Greek waters were dedicated to Achilles. Herodotus, Pliny the Elder and Strabo reported on the existence of a town Achílleion (Ἀχίλλειον), built by settlers from Mytilene in the sixth century BC, close to the hero's presumed burial mound in the Troad. Later attestations point to an Achílleion in Messenia (according to Stephanus Byzantinus) and an Achílleios (Ἀχίλλειος) in Laconia. The village of Achilleium, located twenty stadia from Kimmerikon near the narrowest crossing at the entrance to Lake Maeotis, contained a sanctuary dedicated to Achilles. Nicolae Densuşianu recognized a connection to Achilles in the names of Aquileia and of the northern arm of the Danube delta, called Chilia (presumably from an older Achileii), although his conclusion, that Leuce had sovereign rights over the Black Sea, evokes modern rather than archaic sea-law.

The Aeacid kings of the Molossians in Epirus claimed to be descended from Achilles, through his son Neoptolemus. Alexander the Great, son of the Epirote princess Olympias, could therefore also claim this descent, and in many ways strove to be like his great ancestor. He is said to have visited the tomb of Achilles at Achilleion while passing Troy. In 216, the Roman emperor Caracalla, while on his way to war against Parthia, emulated Alexander by holding games around Achilles's tumulus.

In his scholia on Lycophron's Alexandra, Tzetzes refers to a tradition concerning a sanctuary at Croton in which Thetis dedicated a garden to Hera, identified by the epithet Ὁπλοσμία ("Hera of the Armory"). According to this tradition, the women of Croton assembled there in mourning attire to perform ritual lamentations for Achilles.

=== Achilleum in Tanagra ===
Plutarch writes that there was a temenos near Tanagra dedicated to Achilles and called the Achilleum (Ἀχίλλειον). He gives the following story to explain its origin, noting that the existence of this temenos raised a question because tradition also preserved stories of hostility between Achilles and the people of Tanagra. It was said that Achilles had once taken Stratonice, the mother of Poemander, by force and had killed Acestor, the son of Ephippus. Nevertheless, the place near Tanagra bore Achilles' name, and the local tradition explained this apparent contradiction through the following account.

In the earliest period, when the territory of Tanagra was still inhabited by separate villages rather than by a unified city, Poemander, the father of Ephippus, lived in a settlement called Stephon. The Achaeans besieged him because he refused to join them in their wars. During the night, Poemander left Stephon and established a fortified settlement called Poemandria.

While the new settlement was being constructed, an architect named Polycrithus came to examine the fortifications. He criticized Poemander's work, mocked the construction, and, in contempt, jumped over the defensive ditch. Angered by this insult, Poemander seized a large stone and attempted to throw it at Polycrithus.

The stone, however, had been hidden there since ancient times, having been placed over sacred objects connected with nocturnal rites. Unaware of its sacred nature, Poemander lifted the stone and threw it. He missed Polycrithus but accidentally killed his son Leucippus.

Because of this killing, Poemander was required by law to leave Boeotia and become an exile and suppliant. His departure was difficult, however, because the Achaeans were still making incursions into the territory of Tanagra. Seeking assistance, Poemander sent his son Ephippus to ask Achilles for help.

Achilles agreed to aid him and came together with Tlepolemus, the son of Heracles, and Peneleos, the son of Hippalcimus. These heroes helped Poemander enter Chalcis, where he was purified of the killing by Elephenor.

After his purification, Poemander honored Achilles, Tlepolemus, and Peneleos for their assistance and granted each of them a temenos.

== Reception during antiquity ==
=== In Greek tragedy ===
The Greek tragedian Aeschylus wrote a trilogy of plays about Achilles, given the title Achilleis by modern scholars. The tragedies relate the deeds of Achilles during the Trojan War, including his defeat of Hector and eventual death. Extant fragments of the Achilleis and other Aeschylean fragments have been assembled to produce a workable modern play. The first part of the Achilleis trilogy, The Myrmidons, focused on the relationship between Achilles and chorus, who represent the Achaean army and try to convince Achilles to give up his quarrel with Agamemnon; only a few lines survive today. In Plato's Symposium, Phaedrus points out that Aeschylus portrayed Achilles as the lover and Patroclus as the beloved; Phaedrus argues that this is incorrect because Achilles, being the younger and more beautiful of the two, was the beloved, who loved his lover so much that he chose to die to avenge him. In the last play, The Phrygians, Priam begged Achilles for the return of his son's body.

The tragedian Sophocles also wrote The Lovers of Achilles, a play with Achilles as the main character. Only a few fragments survive.

Towards the end of the fifth century BC, a more negative view of Achilles emerges in Greek drama; Euripides refers to Achilles in a bitter or ironic tone in Hecuba, Electra, and Iphigenia in Aulis.

Other contemporary tragedians, such as Astydamas, wrote works on Achilles that are completely lost today.

=== In Greek philosophy ===
==== Zeno ====
The philosopher Zeno of Elea centred one of his paradoxes on an imaginary footrace between "swift-footed" Achilles and a tortoise, by which he attempted to show that Achilles could not catch up to a tortoise with a head start, and therefore that motion and change were impossible. As a student of the monist Parmenides and a member of the Eleatic school, Zeno believed time and motion to be illusions.

==== Plato ====
In Hippias Minor, a Socratic dialogue attributed to Plato, an arrogant man named Hippias argues with Socrates. The two get into a discussion about lying. They decide that a person who is intentionally false must be "better" than a person who is unintentionally false, on the basis that someone who lies intentionally must understand the subject about which they are lying. Socrates uses various analogies, discussing athletics and the sciences to prove his point. The two also reference Homer extensively. Socrates and Hippias agree that Odysseus, who concocted a number of lies throughout the Odyssey and other stories in the Trojan War Cycle, was false intentionally. Achilles, like Odysseus, told numerous falsehoods. Hippias believes that Achilles was a generally honest man, while Socrates believes that Achilles lied for his own benefit. The two argue over whether it is better to lie on purpose or by accident. Socrates eventually abandons Homeric arguments and makes sports analogies to drive home the point: someone who does wrong on purpose is a better person than someone who does wrong unintentionally.

=== In Roman and medieval literature ===
The Romans, who traditionally traced their lineage to Troy, took a highly negative view of Achilles. Virgil refers to Achilles as a savage and a merciless butcher of men, while Horace portrays Achilles ruthlessly slaying women and children. Other writers, such as Catullus, Propertius, and Ovid, represent a second strand of disparagement, with an emphasis on Achilles's erotic career. This strand continues in Latin accounts of the Trojan War by writers such as Dictys Cretensis and Dares Phrygius and in Benoît de Sainte-Maure's Roman de Troie and Guido delle Colonne's Historia destructionis Troiae, which remained the most widely read and retold versions of the Matter of Troy until the seventeenth century.

Achilles was described by the Byzantine chronicler Leo the Deacon, not as Hellene, but as Scythian, while according to the Byzantine author John Malalas, his army was made up of a tribe previously known as Myrmidons and later as Bulgars.

== In modern literature and arts ==
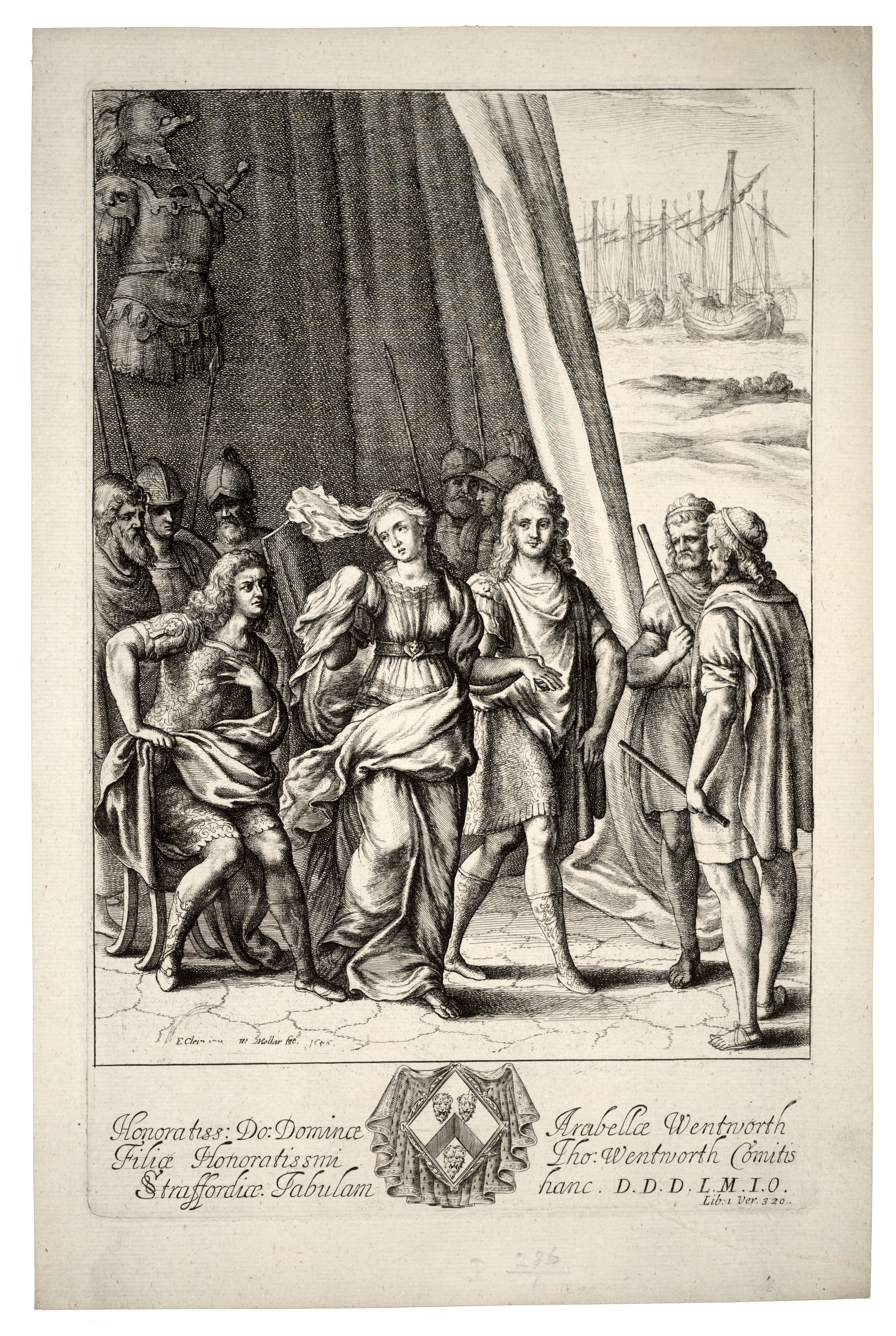
Briseis and Achilles, engraving by Wenceslaus Hollar (1607–1677)

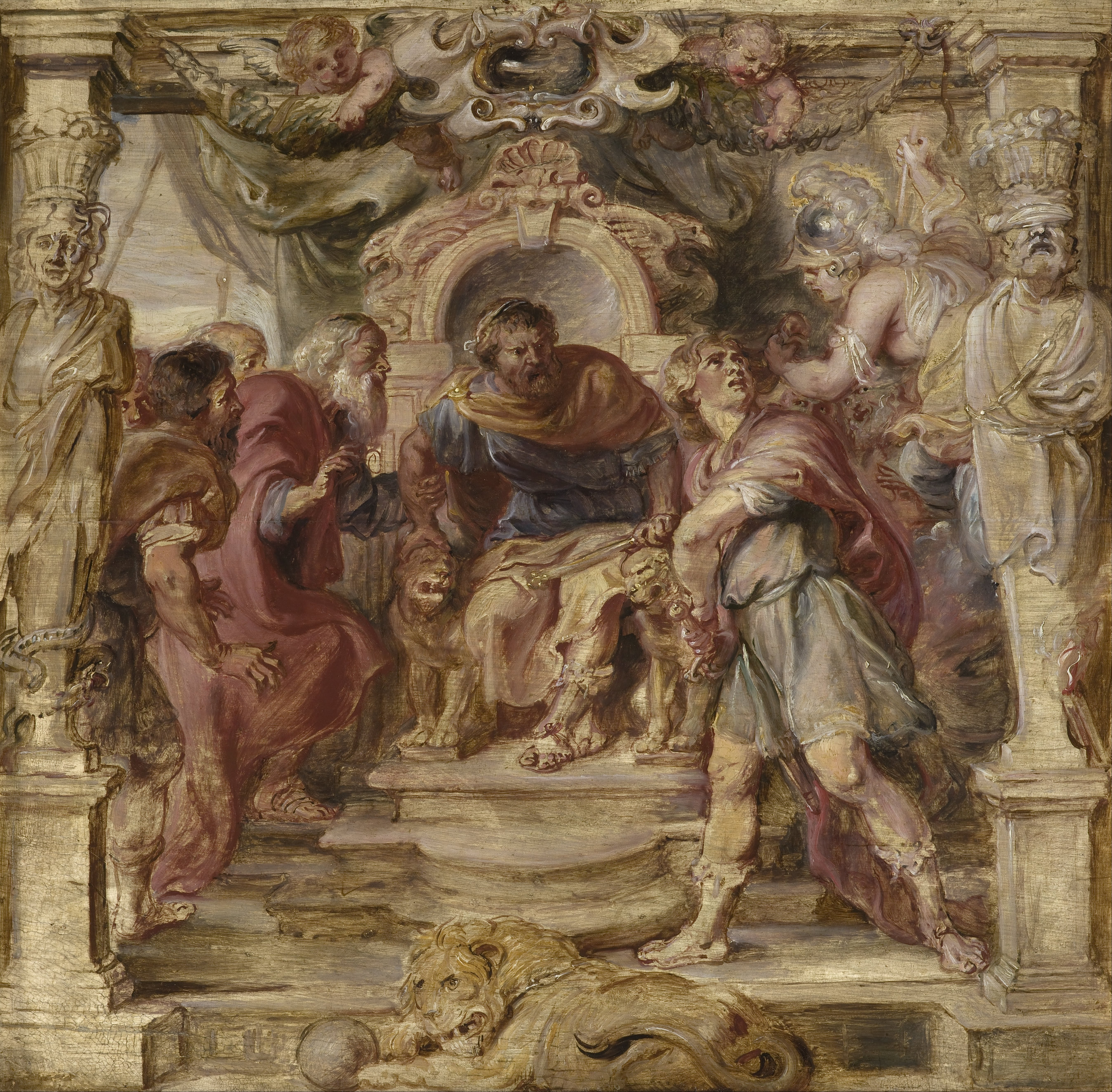
The Wrath of Achilles (c. 1630–1635), painting by Peter Paul Rubens

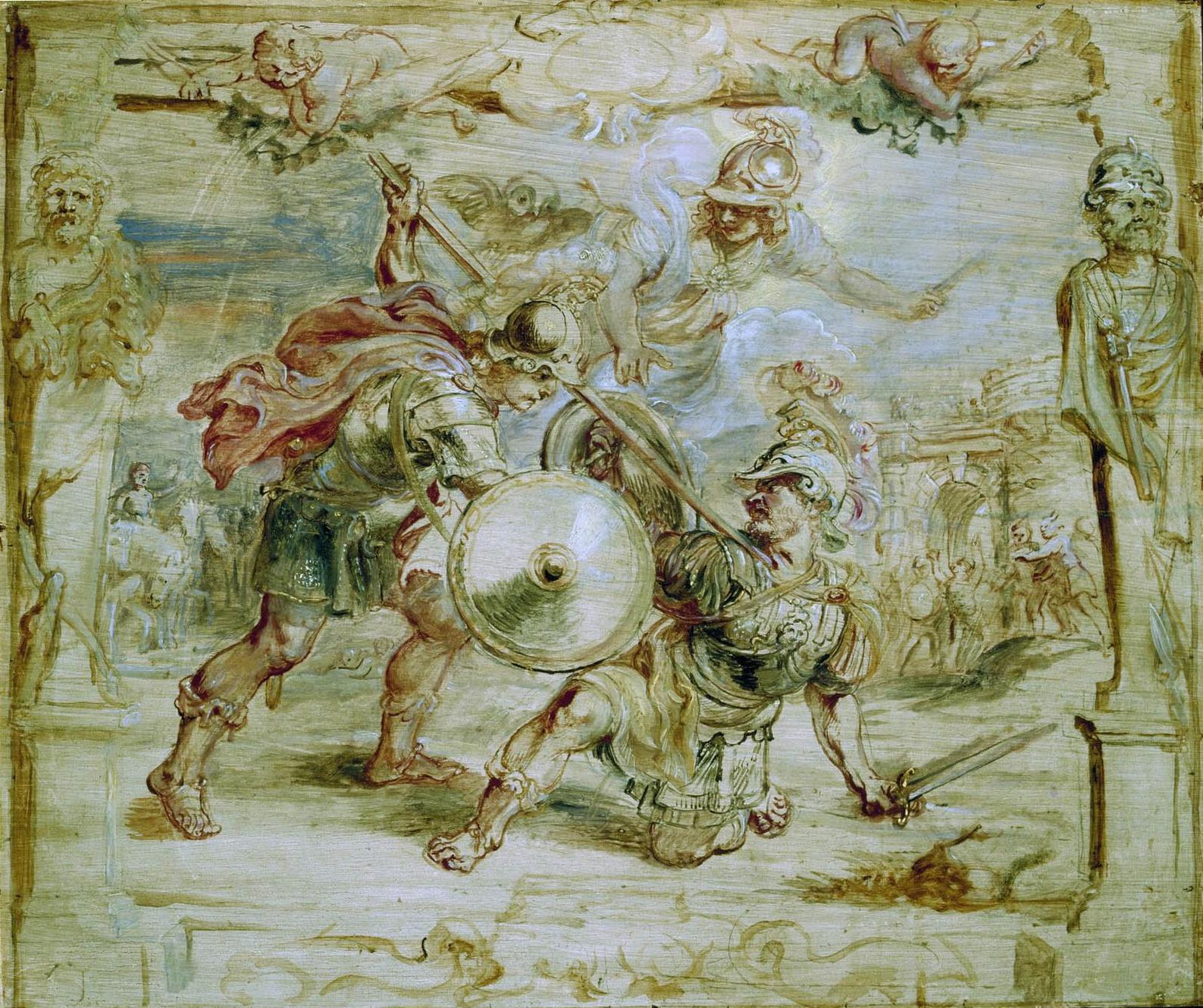
The death of Hector, unfinished oil painting by Peter Paul Rubens

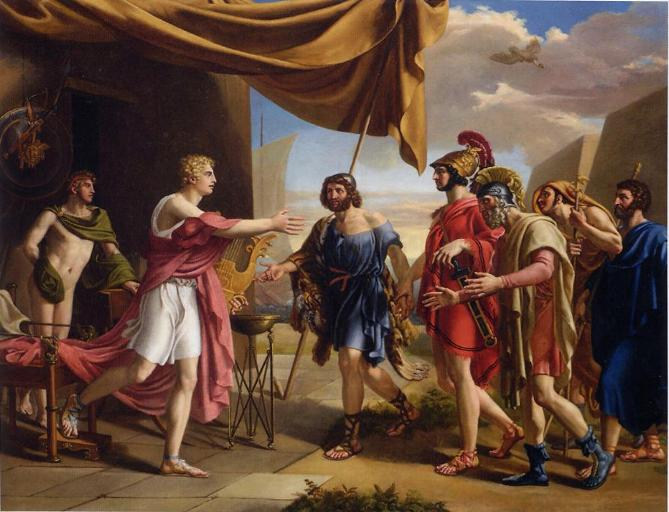
Achilles and Agamemnon by Gottlieb Schick (1801)

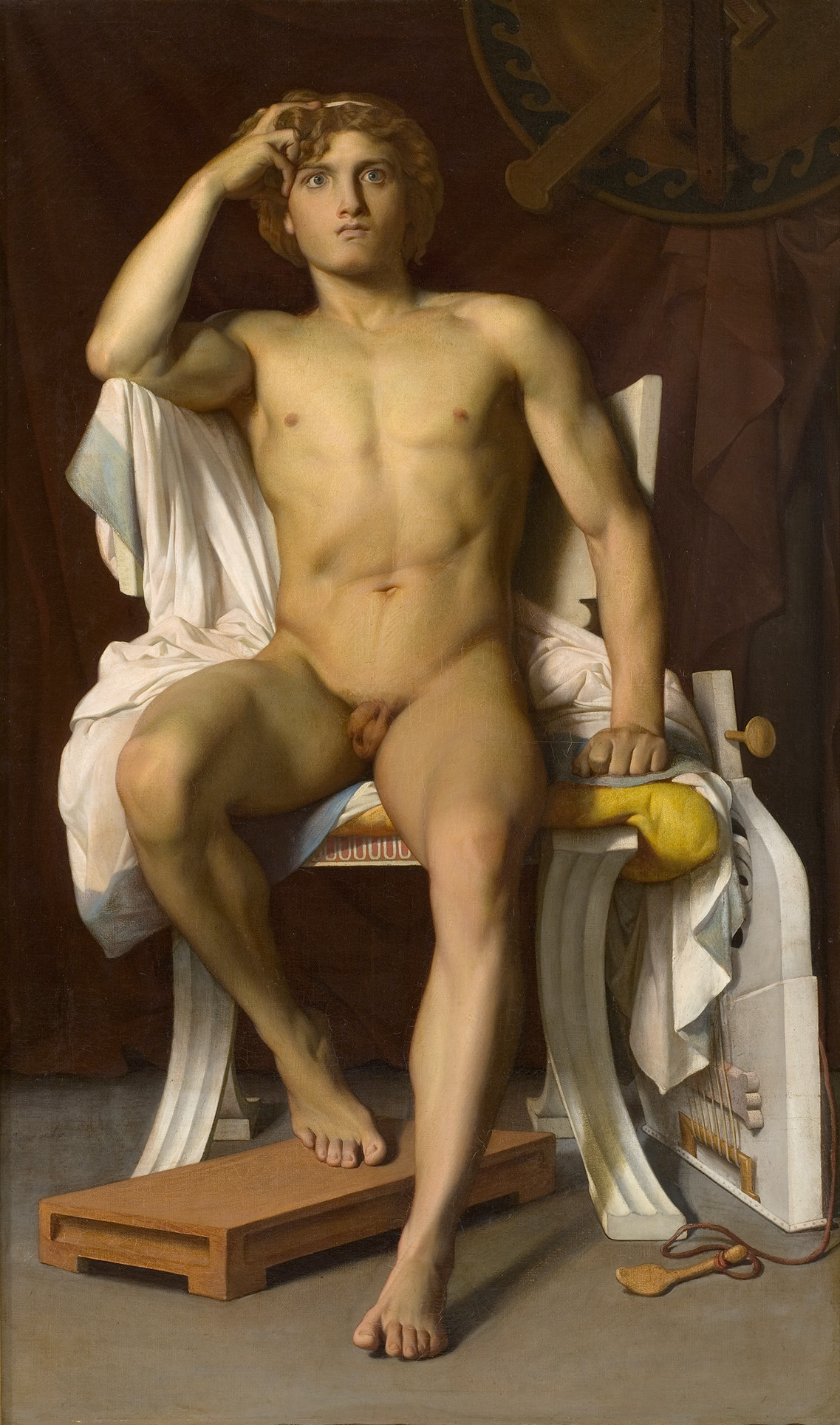
The Wrath of Achilles, by François-Léon Benouville (1847; Musée Fabre)

=== Literature ===
- Achilles appears in Dante's Inferno (composed 1308–1320). He is seen in Hell's second circle, that of lust.
- Achilles is portrayed as a former hero who has become lazy and devoted to the love of Patroclus, in William Shakespeare's Troilus and Cressida (1602). Despicably, he has his Myrmidons murder the unarmed Hector, and then gets them to announce that Achilles himself has slain Hector, as if it had been in a fair fight (Act 5.9.5-14).
- The French dramatist Thomas Corneille wrote a tragedy La Mort d'Achille (1673).
- Achilles is the subject of the poem Achilleis (1799), a fragment by Johann Wolfgang von Goethe.
- In 1899, the Polish playwright, painter and poet Stanisław Wyspiański published a national drama, based on Polish history, named Achilles.
- In 1921, Edward Shanks published The Island of Youth and Other Poems, concerned among others with Achilles.
- The 1983 novel Kassandra by Christa Wolf also treats the death of Achilles.
- H.D.'s 1961 long poem Helen in Egypt features Achilles prominently as a figure whose irrational hatred of Helen traumatizes her, the bulk of the poem's plot being about her recovery.
- Achilles is killed by a poisoned Centaur arrow shot by Cassandra in Marion Zimmer Bradley's novel The Firebrand (1987).
- Achilles is one of various 'narrators' in Colleen McCullough's novel The Song of Troy (1998).
- The Death of Achilles (Смерть Ахиллеса, 1998) is an historical detective novel by Russian writer Boris Akunin that alludes to various figures and motifs from the Iliad.
- The character Achilles in Ender's Shadow (1999), by Orson Scott Card, shares his namesake's cunning mind and ruthless attitude.
- Achilles is one of the main characters in Dan Simmons's novels Ilium (2003) and Olympos (2005).
- Achilles is a major supporting character in David Gemmell's Troy series of books (2005–2007).
- Achilles is the main character in David Malouf's novel Ransom (2009).
- The ghost of Achilles appears in Rick Riordan's The Last Olympian (2009). He warns Percy Jackson about the Curse of Achilles and its side effects.
- Achilles is a main character in Terence Hawkins's 2009 novel The Rage of Achilles.
- Achilles is a major character in Madeline Miller's debut novel, The Song of Achilles (2011), which won the 2012 Orange Prize for Fiction. The novel explores the relationship between Patroclus and Achilles from boyhood to the fateful events of the Iliad.
- Achilles appears in the light novel series Fate/Apocrypha (2012–2014) as the Rider of Red.
- Achilles is a main character in Pat Barker's 2018 novel The Silence of the Girls, much of which is narrated by his slave Briseis.
- Achilles is the protagonist of Wrath Goddess Sing, Maya Deane's 2022 novel.

=== Visual arts ===
- Achilles with the Daughters of Lycomedes is a subject treated in paintings by Anthony van Dyck (before 1618; Museo del Prado, Madrid) and Nicolas Poussin (c. 1652; Museum of Fine Arts, Boston) among others.
- Peter Paul Rubens has authored a series of works on the life of Achilles, comprising the titles: Thetis dipping the infant Achilles into the river Styx, Achilles educated by the centaur Chiron, Achilles recognized among the daughters of Lycomedes, The wrath of Achilles, The death of Hector, Thetis receiving the arms of Achilles from Vulcanus, The death of Achilles (Museum Boijmans Van Beuningen, Rotterdam), and Briseis restored to Achilles (Detroit Institute of Arts; all c. 1630–1635)
- Pieter van Lint, "Achilles Discovered among the Daughters of Lycomedes", 1645, at the Israel Museum, Jerusalem
- Dying Achilles is a sculpture created by Christophe Veyrier (c. 1683; Victoria and Albert Museum, London).
- The Rage of Achilles is a fresco by Giovanni Battista Tiepolo (1757, Villa Valmarana Ai Nani, Vicenza).
- Eugène Delacroix painted a version of The Education of Achilles for the ceiling of the Paris Palais Bourbon (1833–1847), one of the seats of the French Parliament.
- Arthur Kaan created a statue group Achilles and Penthesilea (1895; Vienna).
- Achilleus (1908) is a lithography by Max Slevogt.

=== Music ===
Achilles has been frequently the subject of operas, ballets and related genres.

- Operas titled Deidamia were composed by Francesco Cavalli (1644) and George Frideric Handel (1739).
- Achille et Polyxène (Paris 1687) is an opera begun by Jean-Baptiste Lully and finished by Pascal Collasse.
- Achille et Déidamie (Paris 1735) is an opera composed by André Campra.
- Achilles (London 1733) is a ballad opera, written by John Gay, parodied by Thomas Arne as Achilles in petticoats in 1773.
- Achille in Sciro is a libretto by Metastasio, composed by Domenico Sarro for the inauguration of the Teatro di San Carlo (Naples, 4 November 1737). An even earlier composition is from Antonio Caldara (Vienna 1736). Later operas on the same libretto were composed by Leonardo Leo (Turin 1739), Niccolò Jommelli (Vienna 1749 and Rome 1772), Giuseppe Sarti (Copenhagen 1759 and Florence 1779), Johann Adolph Hasse (Naples 1759), Giovanni Paisiello (St. Petersburg 1772), Giuseppe Gazzaniga (Palermo 1781) and many others. It has also been set to music as Il Trionfo della gloria.
- Achille (Vienna 1801) is an opera by Ferdinando Paër on a libretto by Giovanni de Gamerra.
- Achille à Scyros (Paris 1804) is a ballet by Pierre Gardel, composed by Luigi Cherubini.
- Achilles, oder Das zerstörte Troja ("Achilles, or Troy Destroyed", Bonn 1885) is an oratorio by the German composer Max Bruch.
- Achilles auf Skyros (Stuttgart 1926) is a ballet by the Austrian-British composer and musicologist Egon Wellesz.
- Achilles' Wrath is a concert piece by Sean O'Loughlin.
- "Temporary Like Achilles" is a song on the 1966 double-album Blonde on Blonde by Bob Dylan
- "Achilles Last Stand" is a song on the 1976 Led Zeppelin album Presence.
- "Achilles, Agony and Ecstasy in Eight Parts" is the first song on the 1992 Manowar album The Triumph of Steel.
- "Achilles Come Down" is a song on the 2017 Gang of Youths album Go Farther in Lightness.

=== Film and television ===
Achilles has been portrayed in the following films and television series:

- The 1924 film Helena by Carlo Aldini
- The 1954 film Ulysses by Piero Lulli
- The 1956 film Helen of Troy by Stanley Baker
- The 1961 film The Trojan Horse by Arturo Dominici
- The 1962 film The Fury of Achilles by Gordon Mitchell
- The 1997 television miniseries The Odyssey by Richard Trewett
- The 2003 television miniseries Helen of Troy by Joe Montana
- The 2004 film Troy by Brad Pitt

=== Architecture ===
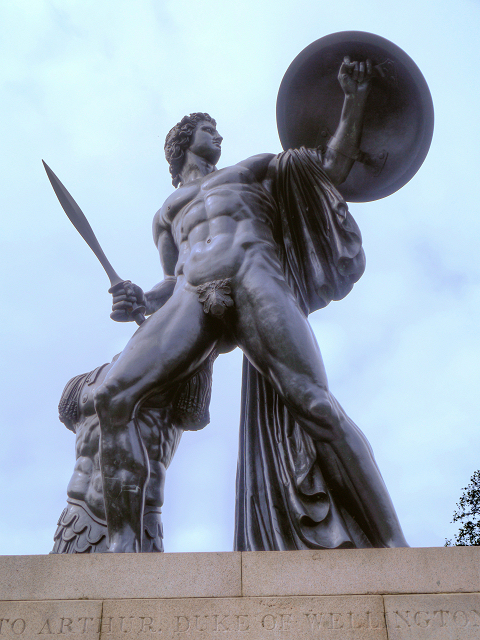
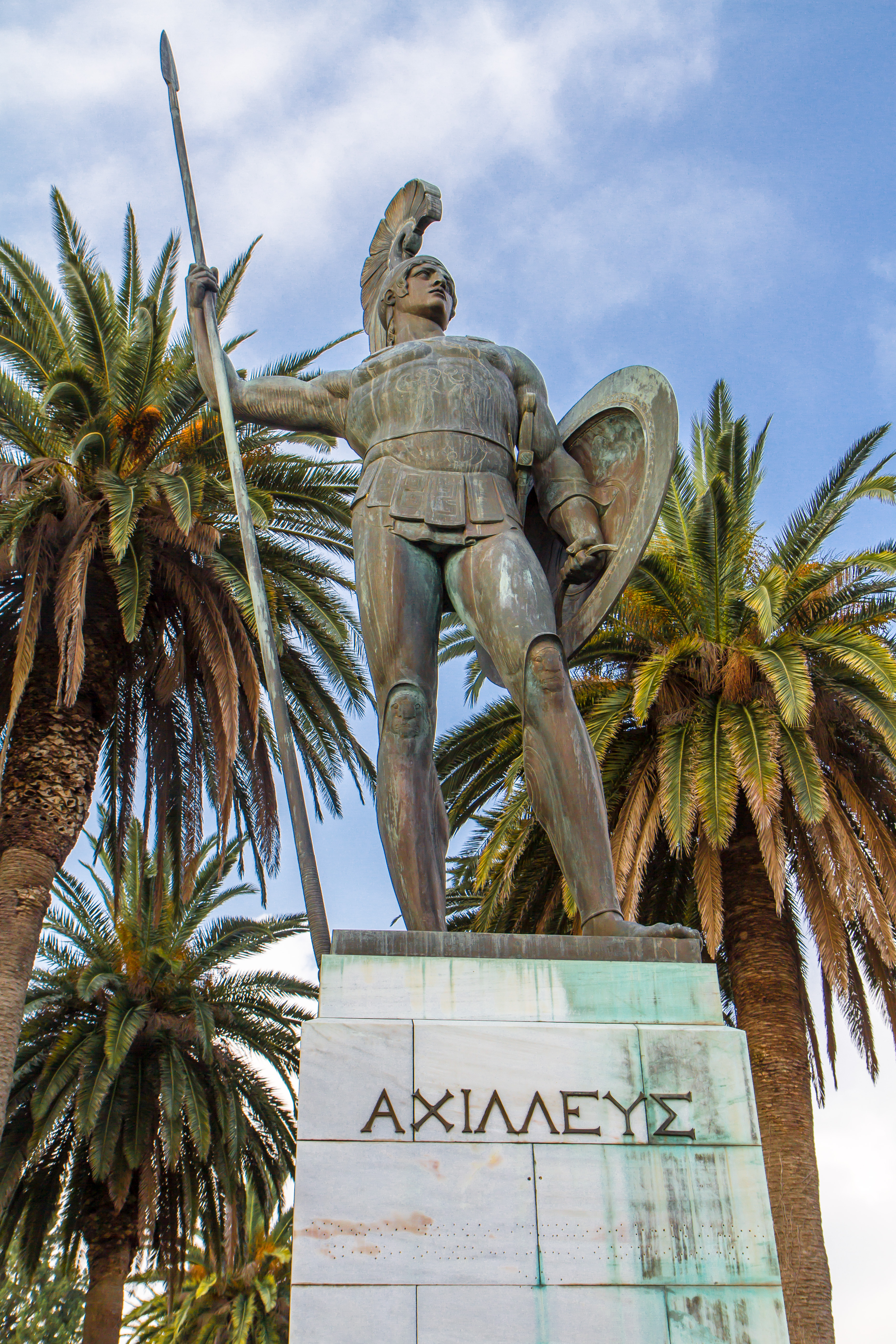
Wellington Monument and Achilles statue in Achilleion
- In 1890, Elisabeth of Bavaria, Empress of Austria, had a summer palace built in Corfu. The building is named the Achilleion, after Achilles. Its paintings and statuary depict scenes from the Trojan War, with particular focus on Achilles.
- The Wellington Monument is a statue representing Achilles erected in 1822 as a memorial to Arthur Wellesley, the first duke of Wellington, and his victories in the Peninsular War and the latter stages of the Napoleonic Wars.

== Namesakes ==
- The name of Achilles has been used for at least nine Royal Navy warships since 1744—both as HMS Achilles and with the French spelling HMS Achille. A 60-gun ship of that name served at the Battle of Belleisle in 1761 while a 74-gun ship served at the Battle of Trafalgar. Other battle honours include Walcheren 1809. An armored cruiser of that name served in the Royal Navy during the First World War.
- HMNZS Achilles was a Leander-class cruiser which served with the Royal New Zealand Navy in World War II. It became famous for its part in the Battle of the River Plate, alongside HMS Ajax and HMS Exeter. In addition to earning the battle honour 'River Plate', HMNZS Achilles also served at Guadalcanal 1942–1943 and Okinawa in 1945. After returning to the Royal Navy, the ship was sold to the Indian Navy in 1948, but when she was scrapped parts of the ship were saved and preserved in New Zealand.
- A species of lizard, Anolis achilles, which has widened heel plates, is named for Achilles.

== Gallery ==
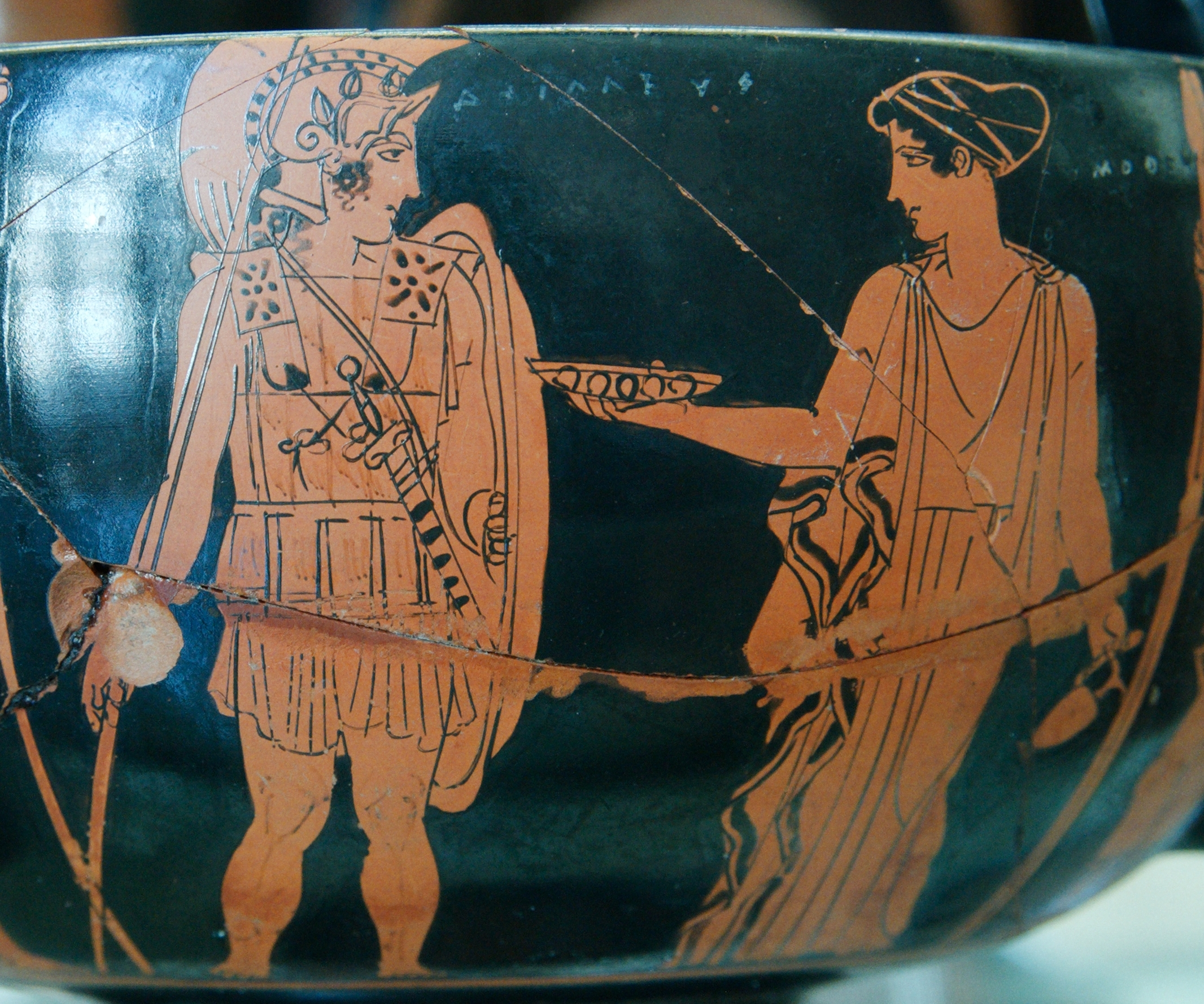
Achilles and the Nereid Cymothoe, Attic red-figure kantharos from Volci (Cabinet des Médailles, Bibliothèque nationale, Paris)

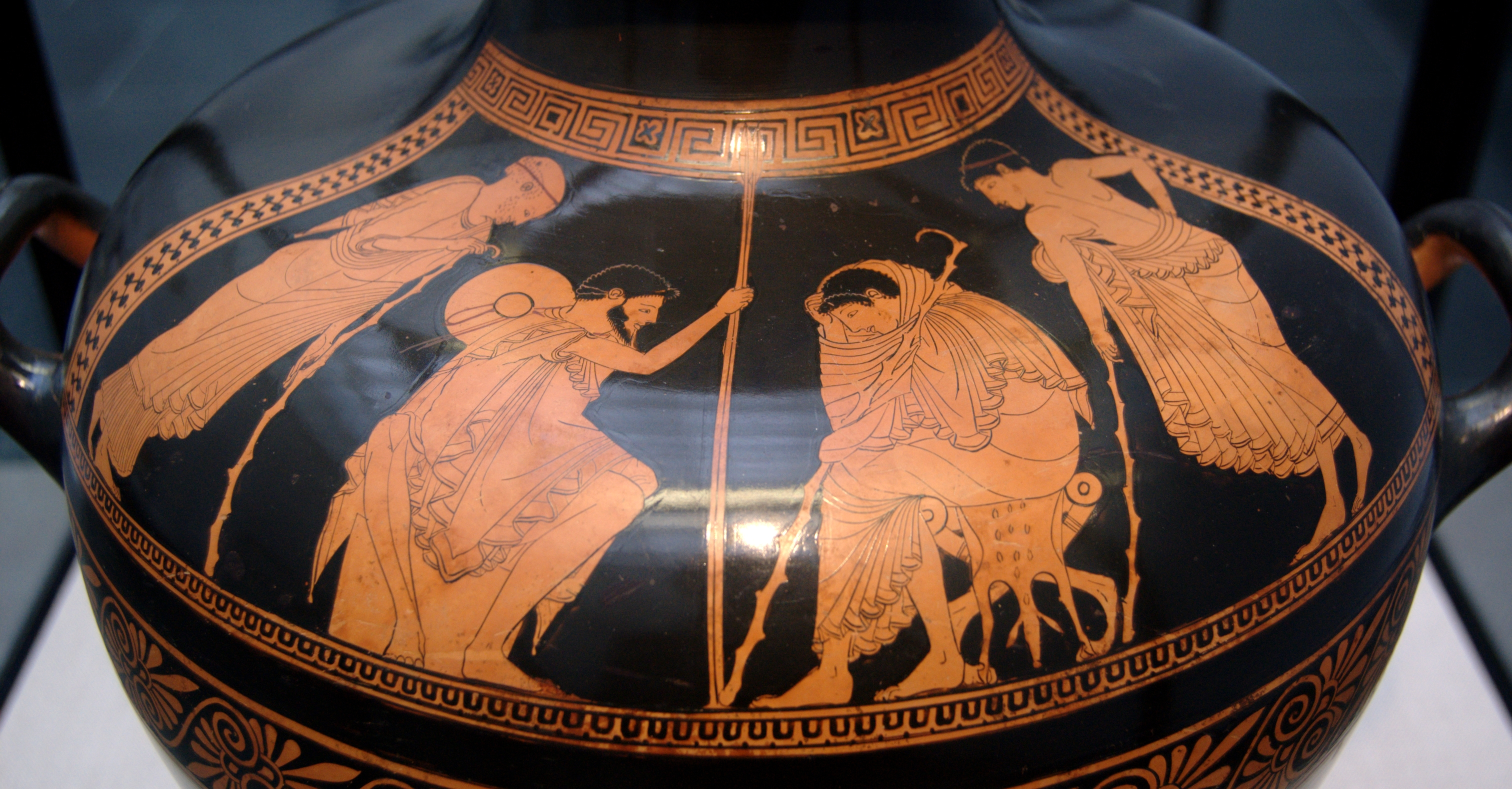
The embassy to Achilles, Attic red-figure hydria, c. 480 BC (Staatliche Antikensammlungen, Berlin)

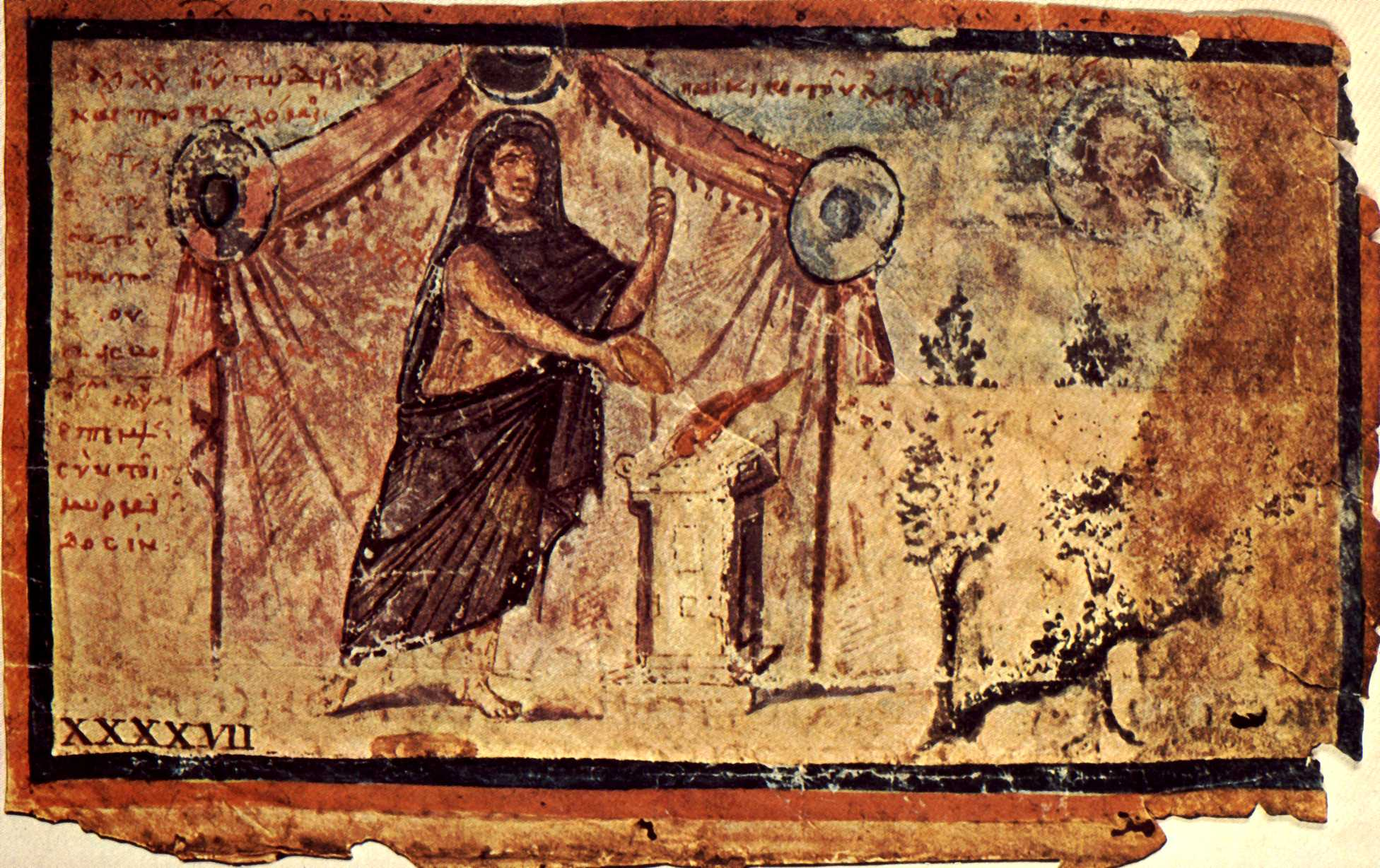
Achilles sacrificing to Zeus for Patroclus's safe return, from the Ambrosian Iliad, a fifth-century illuminated manuscript

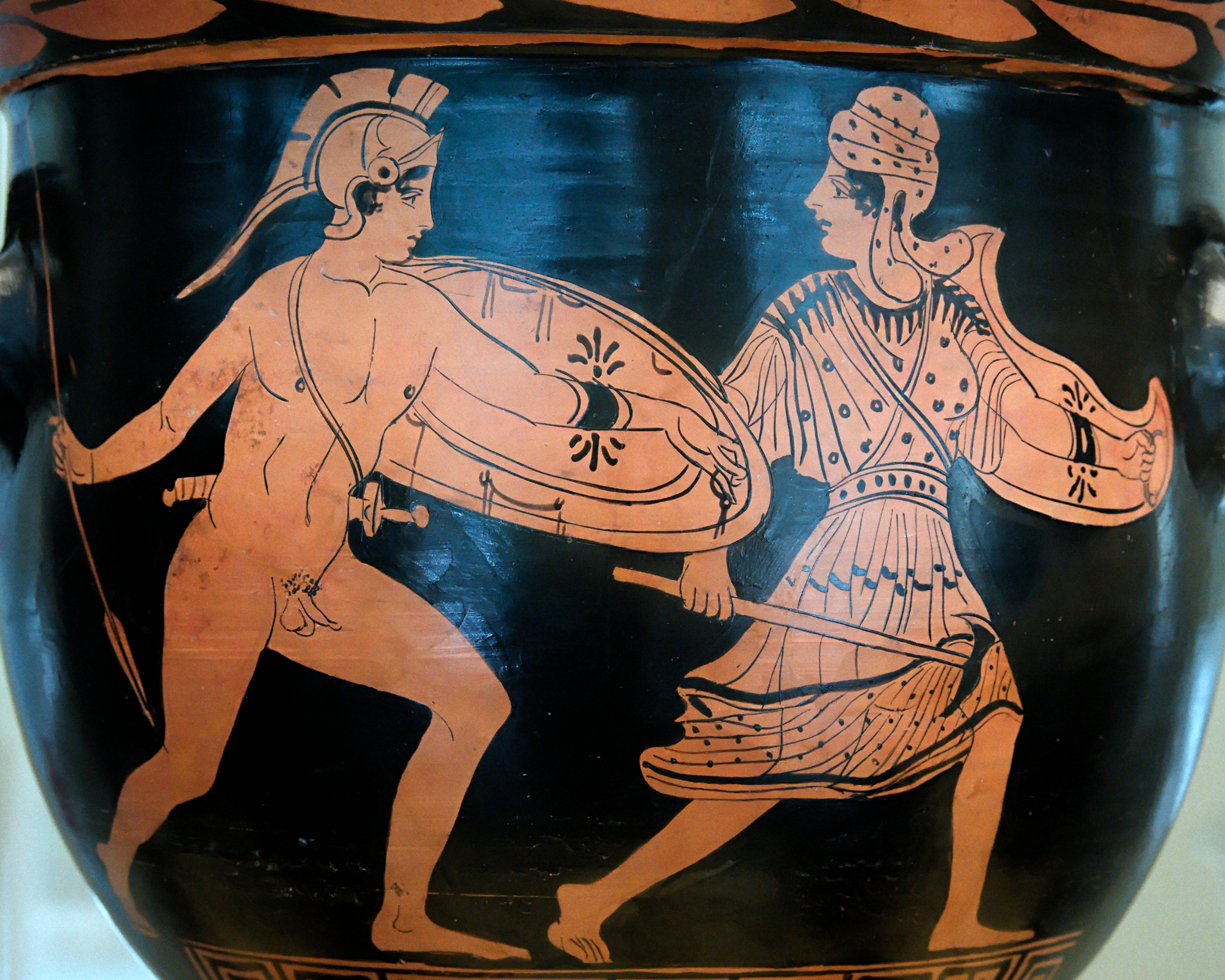
Achilles and Penthesilea fighting, Lucanian red-figure bell-krater, late fifth century BC

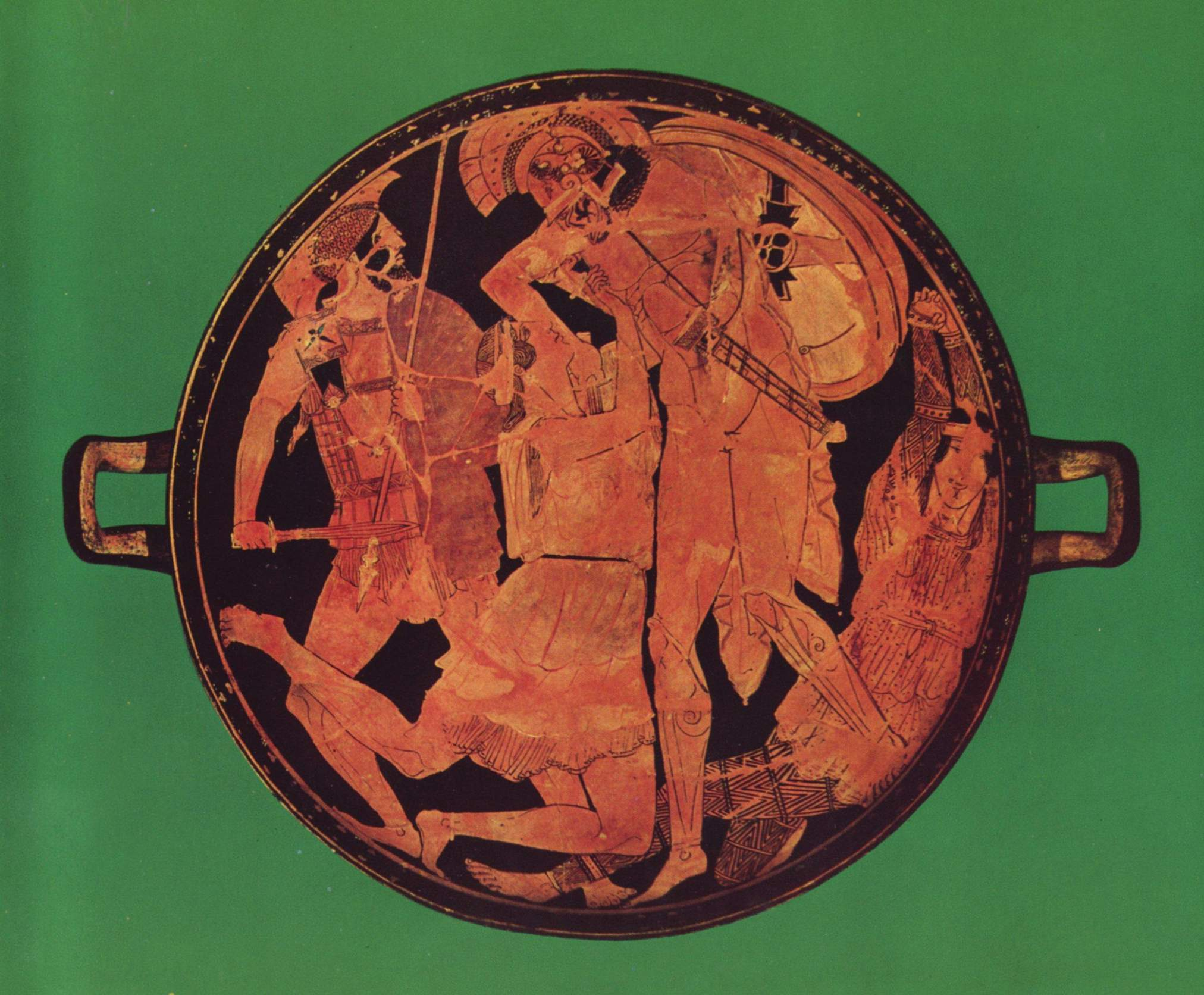
Achilles killing Penthesilea, tondo of an Attic red-figure kylix, c. 465 BC, from Vulci

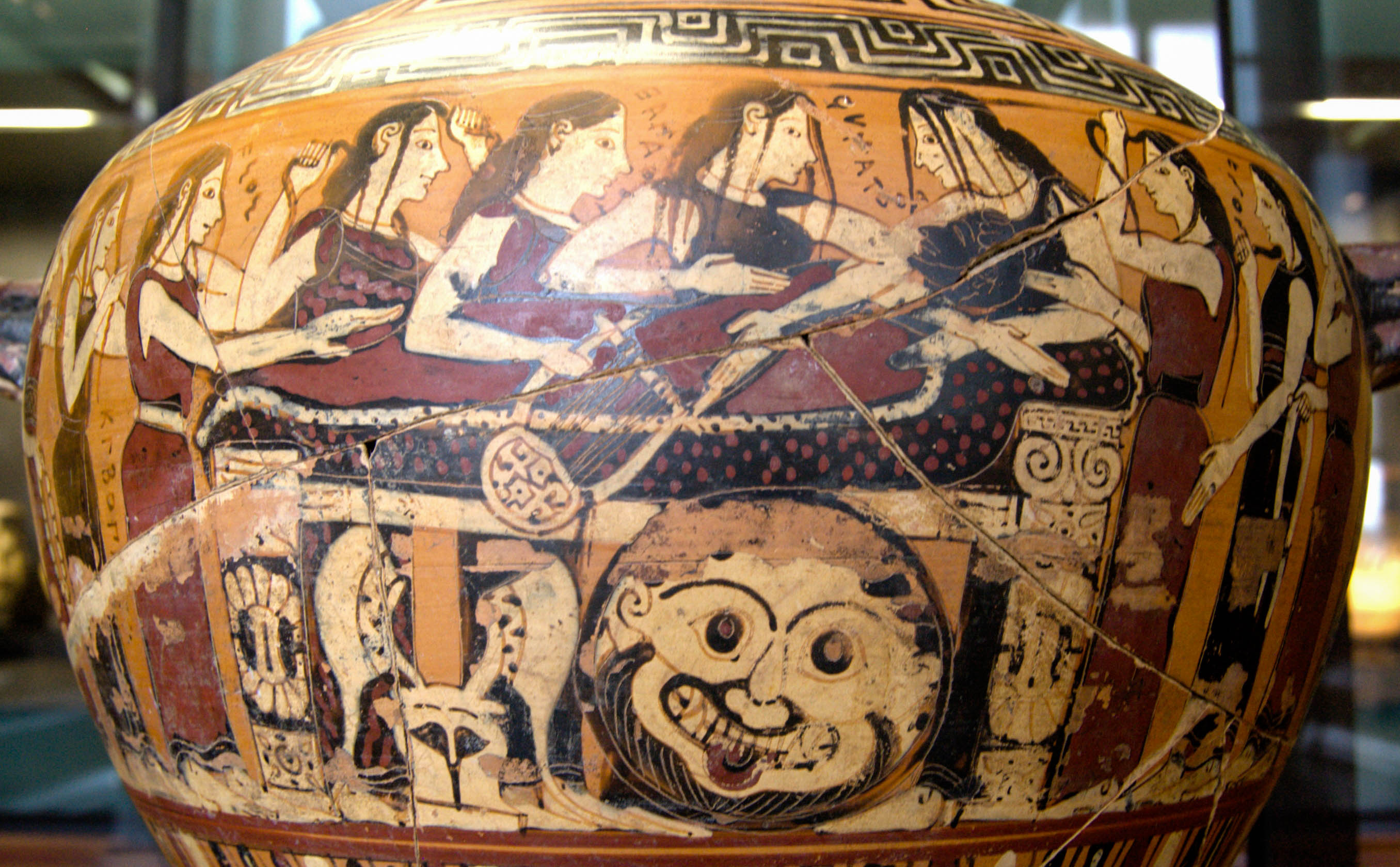
Thetis and the Nereids mourning Achilles, Corinthian black-figure hydria, c. 555 BC (Louvre, Paris)

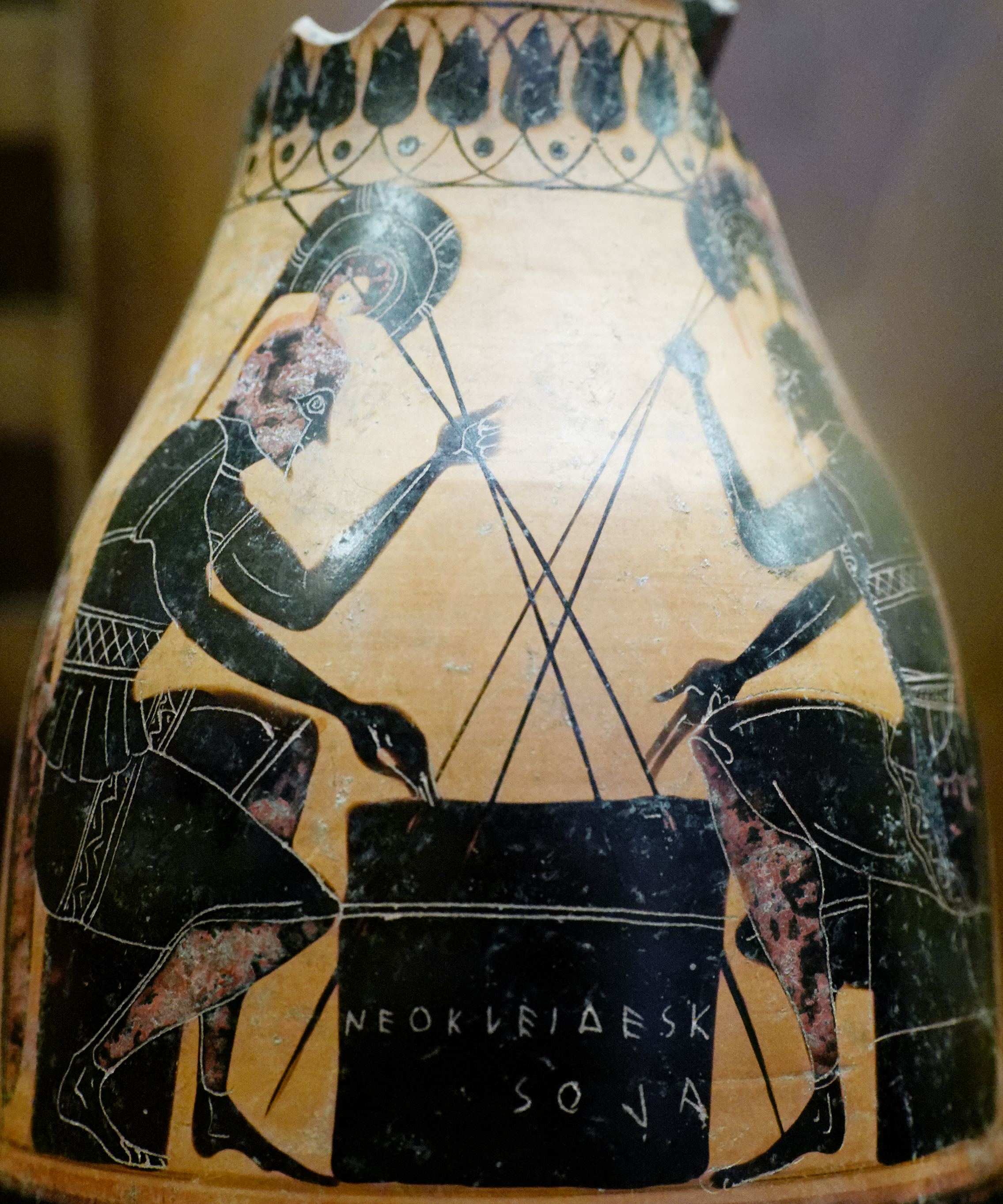
Achilles and Ajax playing the board game petteia, black-figure oinochoe, c. 530 BC (Capitoline Museums, Rome)

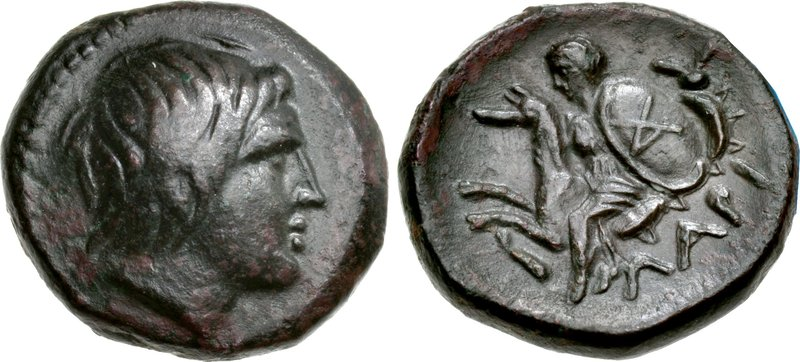
Head of Achilles depicted on a fourth-century BC coin from Kremaste, Phthia. Reverse: Thetis, wearing and holding the shield of Achilles with his AX monogram

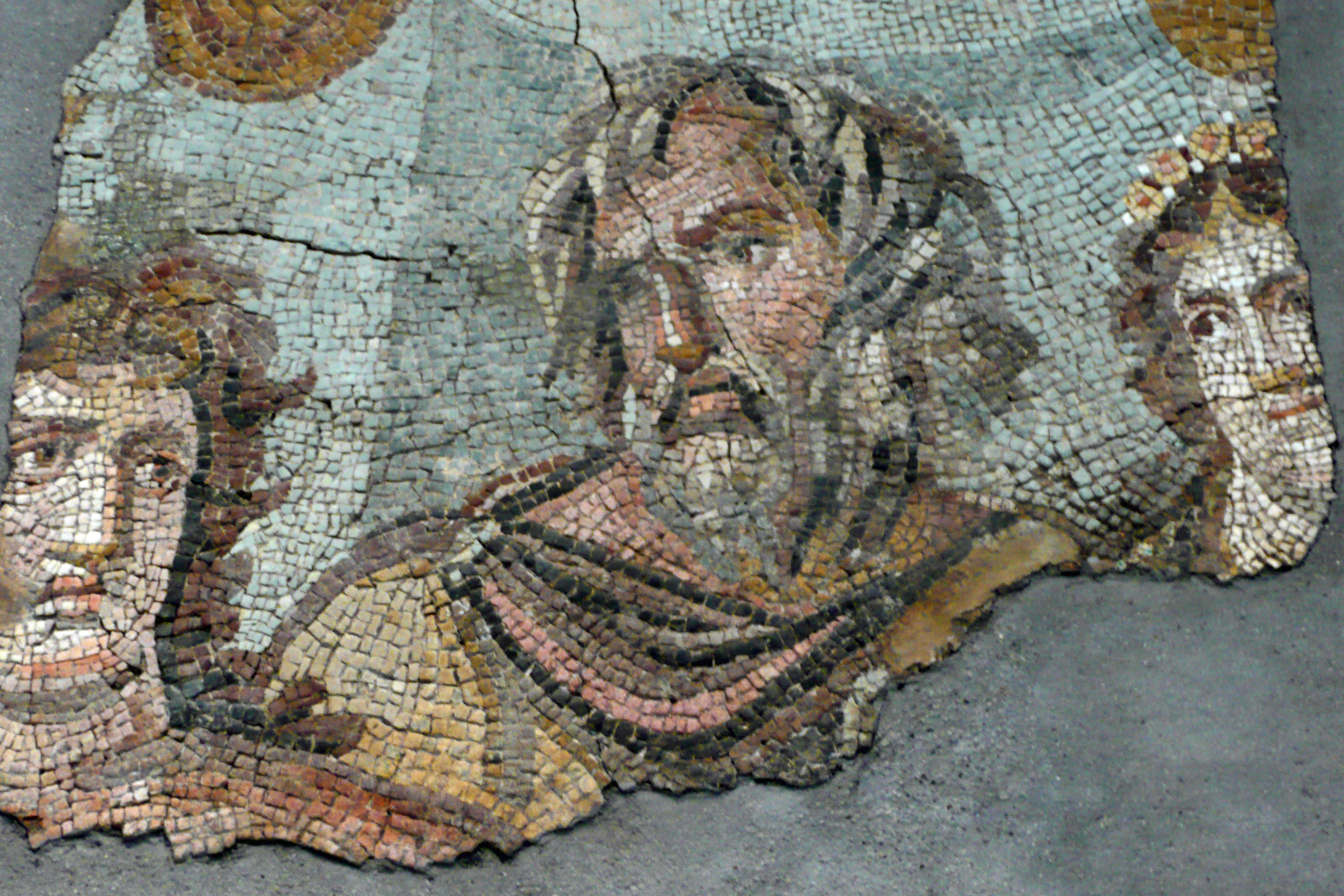
Achilles on a Roman mosaic with the Removal of Briseis, second century

== See also ==
- Mycenaean Greece
- Phthiotis
