= Achilles on Skyros =

Myth of the Greek warrior's life

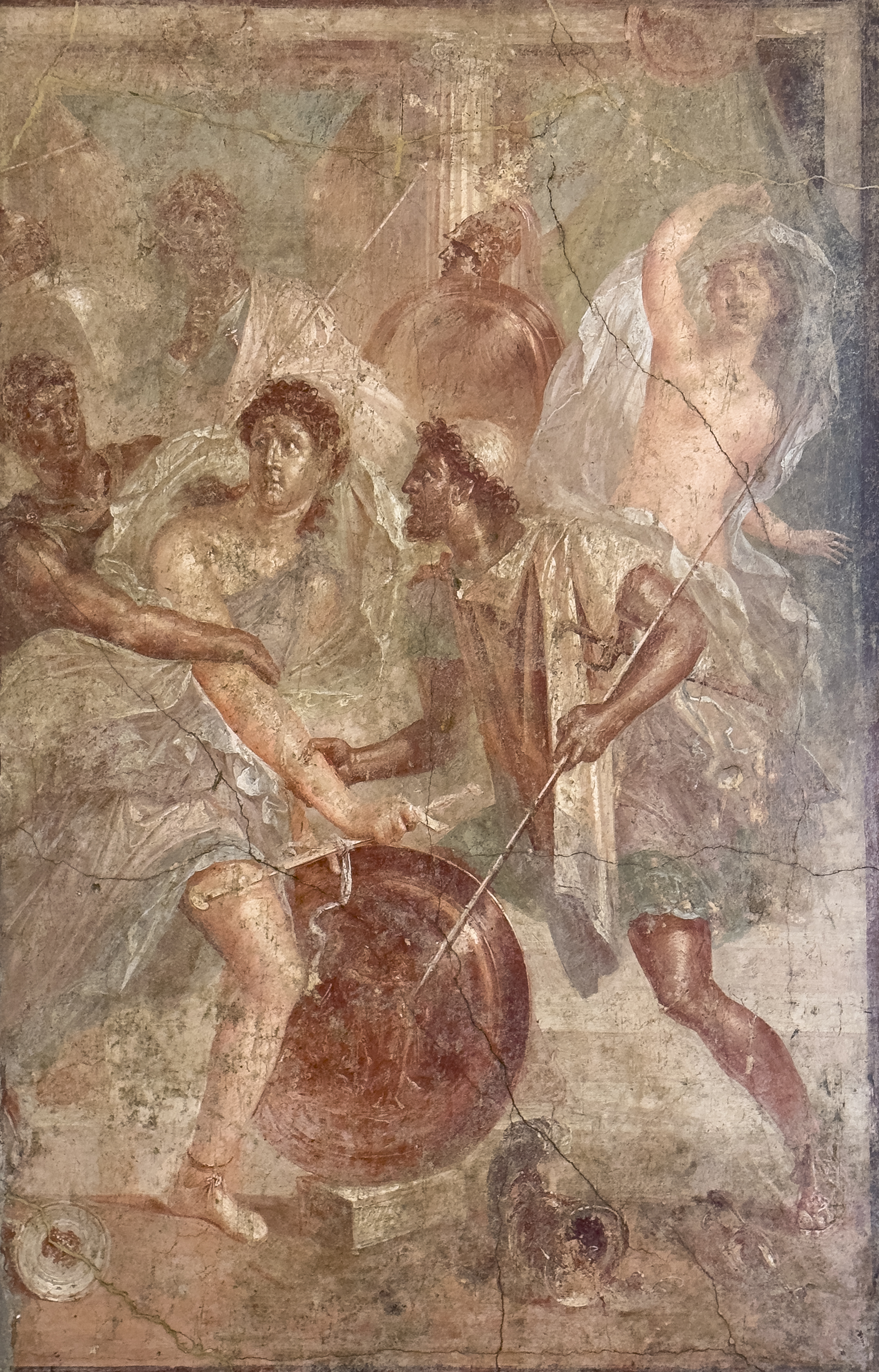
Fresco from the House of the Dioscuri in Pompeii depicting Achilles between Diomedes and Odysseus at Skyros

Achilles on Skyros is an episode in the myth of Achilles, a Greek hero of the Trojan War. Not existing in Homer's epic poem Iliad, the episode is written down in detail in some later versions of the story, particularly the Achilleid by the Roman poet Statius. The story of how Achilles disguised himself as a girl at the court of the king of Skyros, fell in love with one of the princesses, and married her before leaving for Troy, became a popular topic in arts and literature from Classical times until the middle of the 20th century. The carnivalesque disguises and gender transpositions at the heart of the story were particularly popular in opera, with over 30 different operas on the theme between 1641 and 1857.

== Story ==
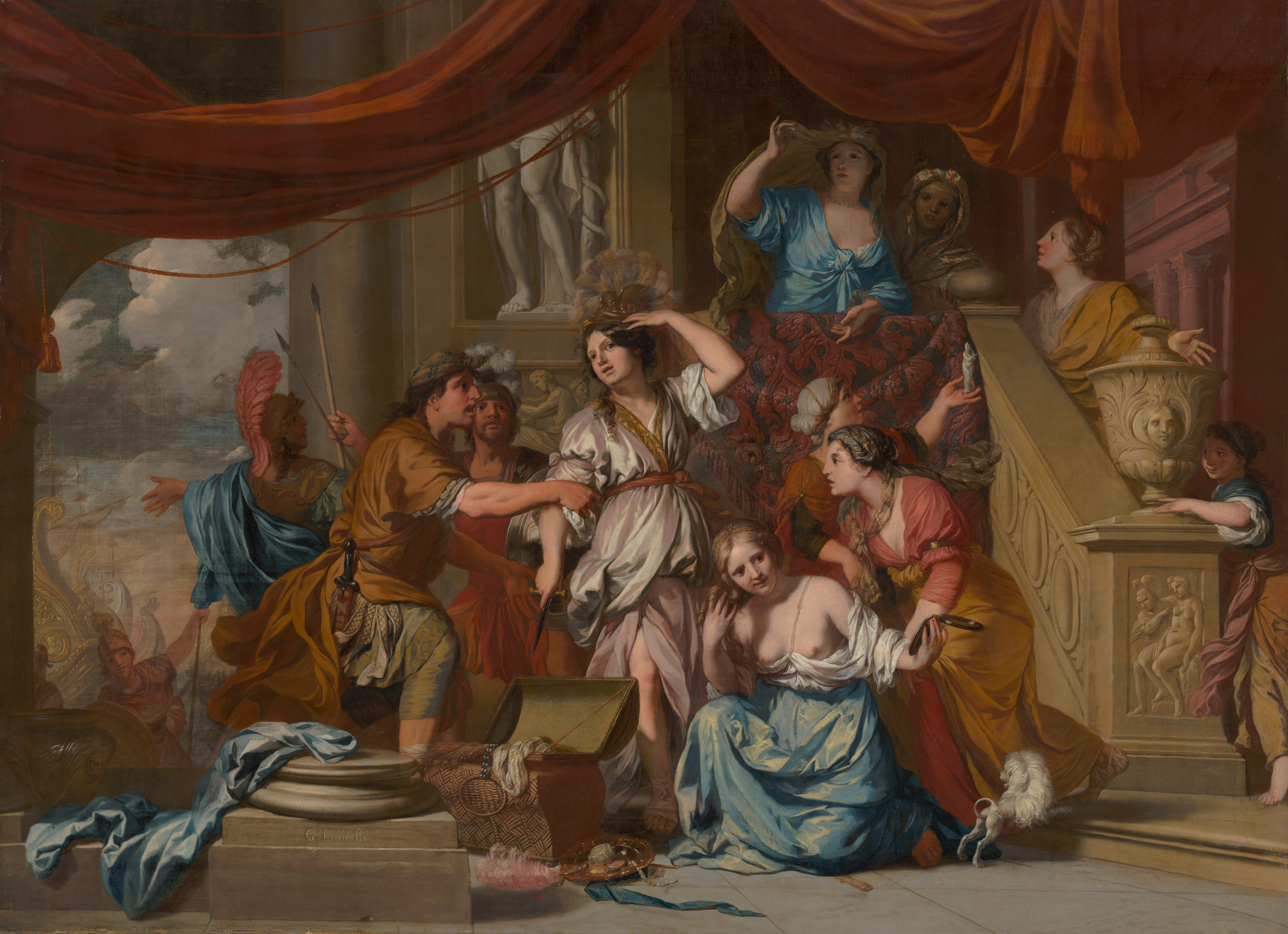
Achilles Discovered among the Daughters of Lycomedes was the usual moment shown in art, here by Gérard de Lairesse

Rather than allow her son Achilles to die at Troy as prophesied, the nymph Thetis sent him to live at the court of Lycomedes of Scyros, disguised as another daughter of the king or as a lady-in-waiting, under the name Pyrrha "the red-haired", Issa, or Kerkysera. There Achilles had an affair with Deidamia, one of the daughters of Lycomedes, and they had one or two sons, Neoptolemus and Oneiros. Since another prophecy suggested that the Trojan War would not be won without Achilles, Odysseus and several other Achaean leaders went to Skyros to find him. Odysseus discovered Achilles by offering gifts, adornments and musical instruments as well as weapons, to the king's daughters, and then having his companions imitate the noises of an enemy's attack on the island (most notably, making a blast of a trumpet heard), which prompted Achilles to reveal himself by picking a weapon to fight back, and together they departed for the Trojan War. In some versions, Deidamia dressed as a man followed him.

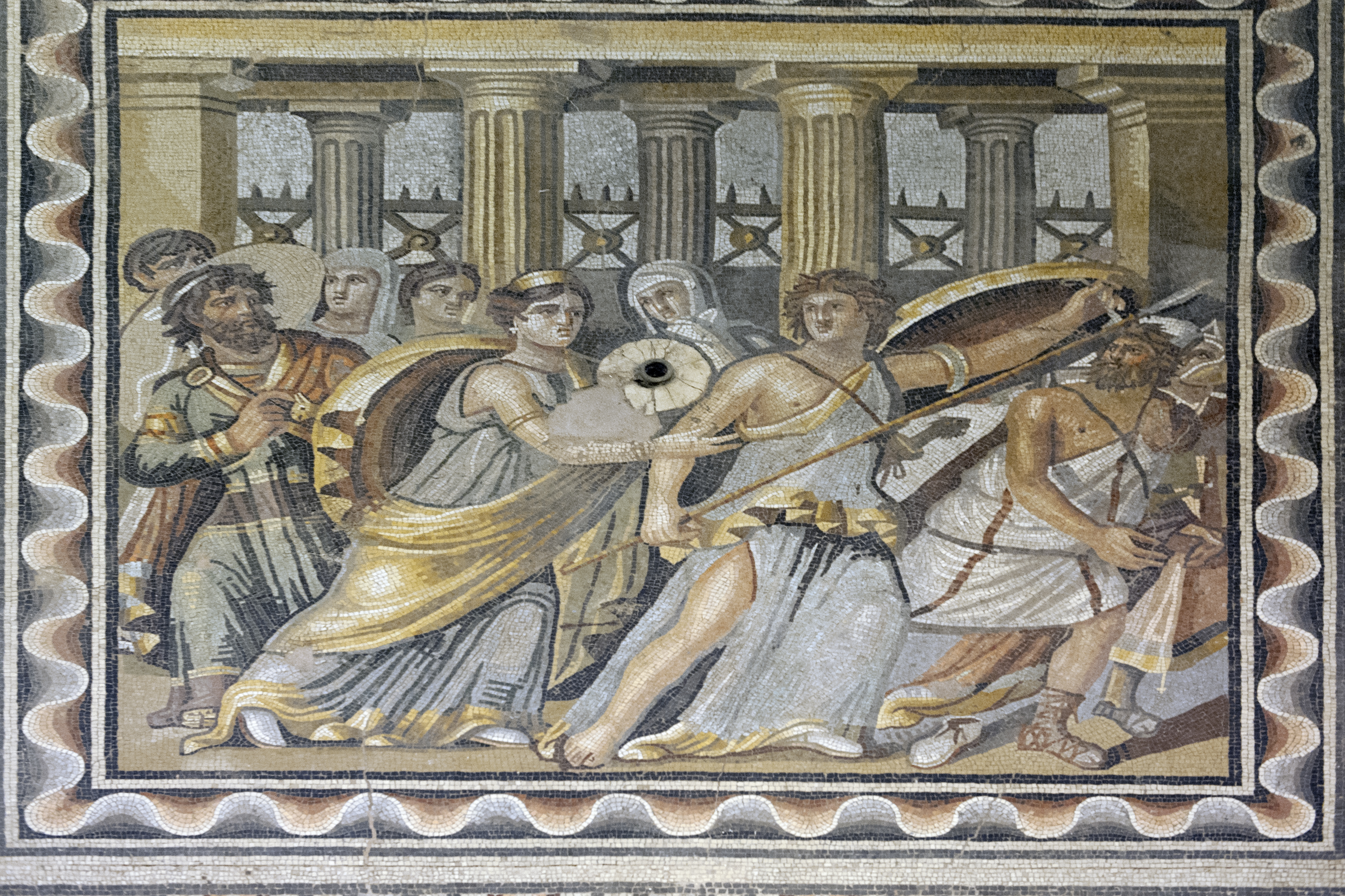
A Roman mosaic from the Poseidon Villa in Zeugma, Commagene (now in the Zeugma Mosaic Museum) depicting Achilles disguised as a woman and Odysseus tricking him into revealing himself

=== The Achilleid ===
The most detailed and elaborate version is that found in the Roman poem Achilleid. In the poem, Thetis resolves to hide Achilles away at the court of Lycomedes. Achilles is quite reluctant, but eventually consents, attracted by the beauty of the king's most fair daughter, Deidamia. Thetis has him dressed up as a maiden and introduces him to Lycomedes as her daughter who would have had an Amazon-like upbringing and now needed to learn feminine ways by living among ordinary girls of her age, so as to prepare for a normal marriage in the future; Lycomedes agrees to take care of the "girl" and his unsuspecting daughters accept Achilles into their company as another fellow maiden. After some time he develops a particularly close friendship with Deidamia and it becomes increasingly difficult for him to hide his romantic and sexual interest in her. Eventually, at a nighttime festival in honour of Dionysus where men are normally not allowed, Achilles rapes Deidamia.

Afterwards, trying to console her, he discloses his true name and origin; despite being scared by what has happened, Deidamia doesn't want Achilles to suffer punishment from her father and resolves to keep the incident and his identity, as well as the fact that she has conceived a child, a secret. When Odysseus and his comrades arrive at Skyros, Achilles, long annoyed by his female disguise, is about to reveal himself but Deidamia holds him back. Odysseus then performs the trick with the gifts and the trumpet and thereby reveals the secret. Achilles hears Deidamia cry and confesses to Lycomedes that they have been engaged in sexual behavior and have had a child together. As the Achaeans are about to sail off to the war, Deidamia is heartbroken over the impending loss of Achilles and asks if she could go with him, but that seems impossible; she then implores him to keep their son in his thoughts, and to never have children with other women. Achilles swears to one day return to Deidamia, but the reader knows that he will die at Troy.

=== Other stories ===
In the Iliad, Achilles is said to have conquered Skyros, said to be the citadel of Enyeus. He took Iphis captive, later giving her to Patroclus. According to the Cypria and Little Iliad, Achilles only arrived on Skyros after mistakenly attacking Mysia, at which point he had already joined the Greek army. A storm had forced his ships to dock on the island, where he then married Deidamia.

One scholium to the Iliad notes that while newer poets said Achilles hid on Skyros in disguise, the earlier heroic poets wrote he came in armor and took it by force. He later gave the spoils of the conquest to his allies. Another records a version where he sailed to Skyros to put down a rebellion against his father Peleus. In this account, he fathered Neoptolemus at that time.

In the Alexandra, Cassandra claims Achilles willingly hid on Skyros because he feared her brother Hector. In one source, it was his father Peleus who sent Achilles to hide on Skyros instead of Thetis.

== Artistic renditions ==
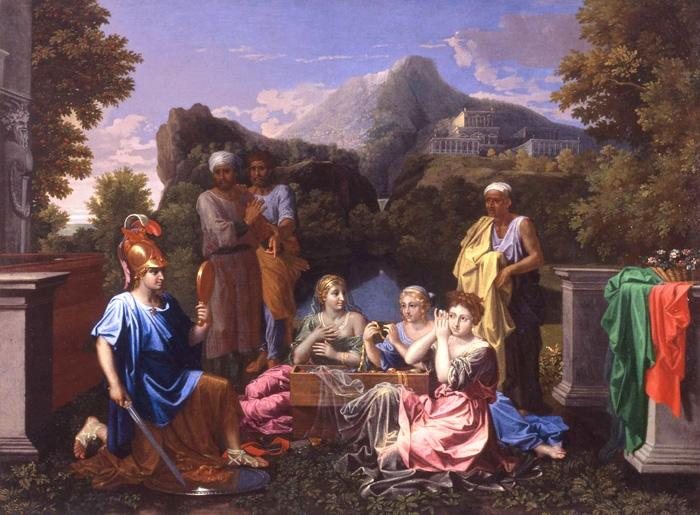
Achilles on Skyros, 1656 painting by Nicolas Poussin, now in the Virginia Museum of Fine Arts

This part of the Trojan War myths has been the subject of many works of art throughout the centuries. Taken from the point of view of Achilles, Deidamia, or a neutral observer, a number of themes have received attention in the later artwork and stories, ranging from the comical aspects of crossdressing and the misunderstandings it involves, over gender differences, heroism, homosexual and heterosexual love, and initiation rites, to rape, incest, and domestic violence.

While most later versions go essentially back to the 1st century CE version of Statius, the story of Achilles on Skyros was known earlier than this. There are references to artworks by Polygnotus and Athenion of Maroneia, and a now lost 5th century BCE play by Euripides.

One of the earliest and best studied Renaissance versions of the story was Tirso de Molina's 1612 play El Aquiles. It was followed by a number of other Spanish plays on the same topic. One of its foci was the change in Achilles from fleeing war to being a war hero. This was emphasized by the many changes and transformations used in the play. But the more typical themes of gender confusion and homosexual love are also apparent, and strengthened by the indication that the role of Achilles should be played by a woman.

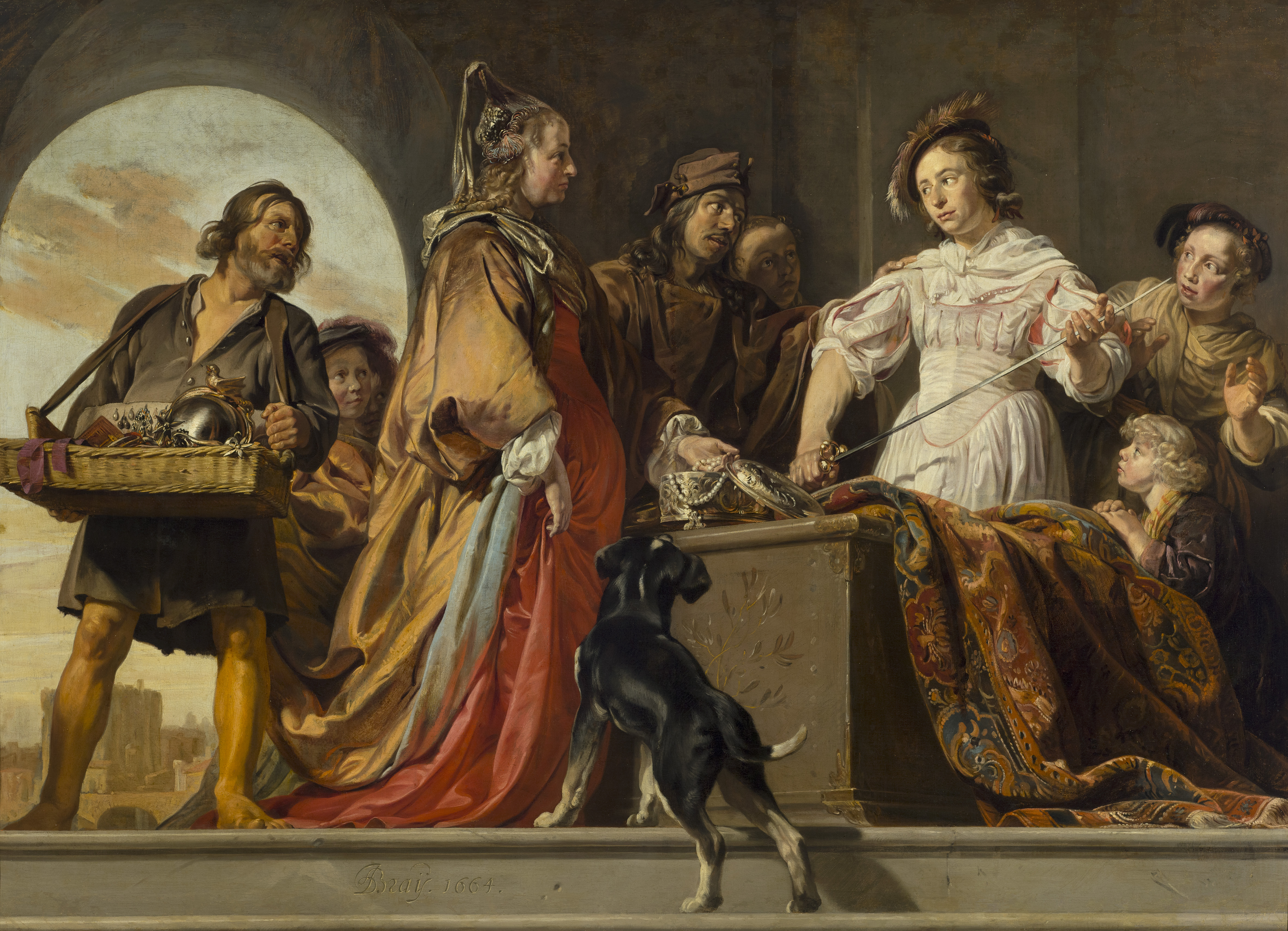
Achilles discovered by Ulysses by Jan de Bray, now in the National Museum, Warsaw

It has often been used as the theme for an opera or ballet, with the libretto by Metastasio as the most popular. The first opera based on this story seems to have been La finta pazza by Francesco Sacrati, with a libretto by Giulio Strozzi. It was the first and probably the most popular opera of the seventeenth century. It was first performed at the inauguration in 1641 of the Teatro Novissimo in Venice, the first time ever a building was created specifically to perform operas. Anna Renzi was the main singer. The production then was performed many times all over Italy and abroad, including a 1645 performance in Paris, which was the second time ever that an opera was staged in France.

The Metastasio libretto was first used for an opera in 1736 by Antonio Caldara, at the occasion of the marriage of Maria Theresa with the future Holy Roman Emperor, Francis I. Due to the short notice given for the marriage, the libretto was finished after only 18 days, compared to the three months Metastasio usually needed. Despite this, it enjoyed a reasonable success and was used for decades, set to music by at least 29 composers. Further version include the 1737 opera by Domenico Sarro, used for the inauguration of the Teatro di San Carlo in Naples, and starring Vittoria Tesi.

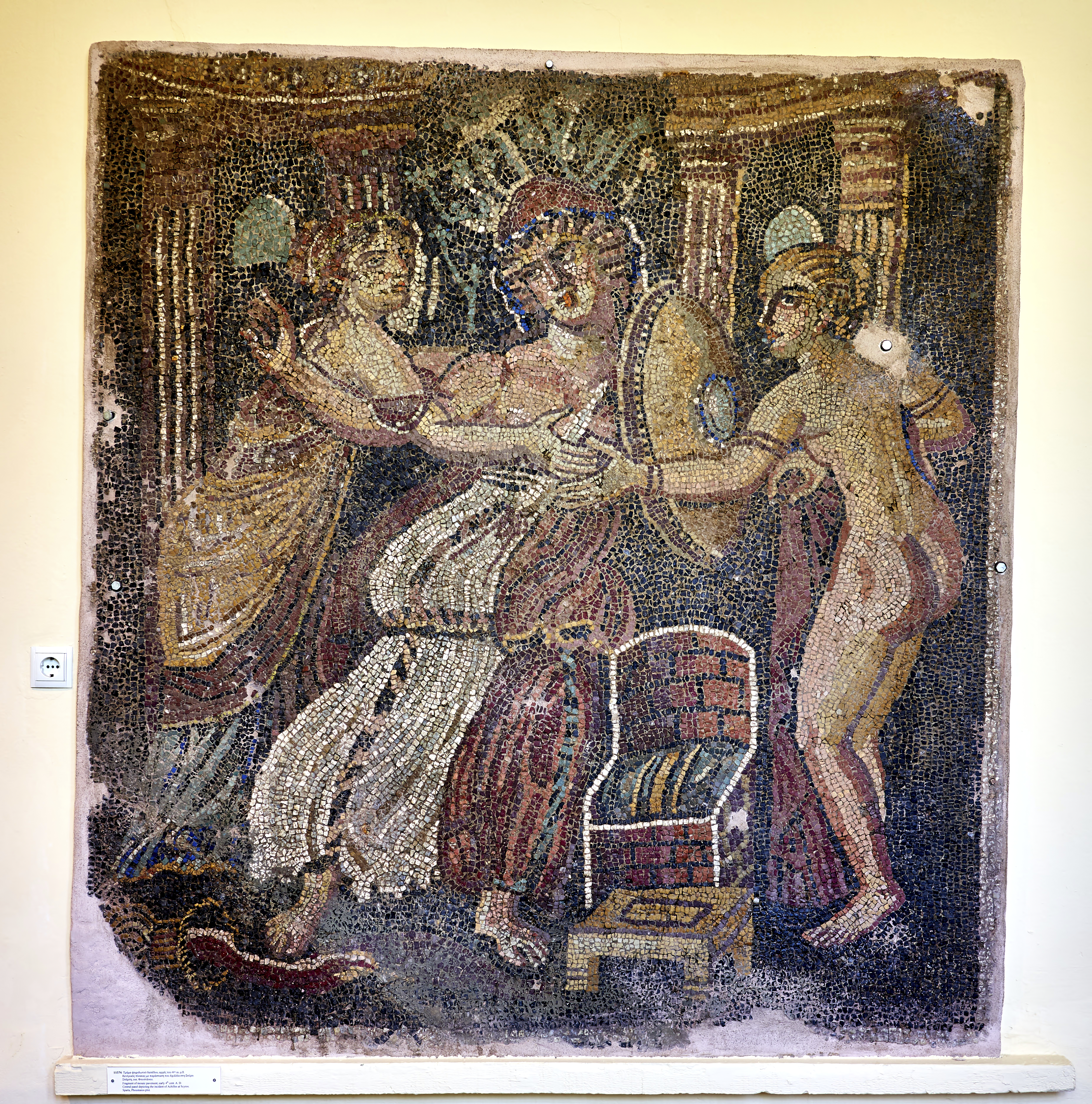
Mosaic of the fourth century AD from Sparta.

The popularity of the theme was due to a number of factors, but a major part was the aspect of disguises and crossdressing, with Achilles dressed as a girl and his role often performed by women. Some librettists, especially the earlier ones like Giulio Strozzi, Carlo Capece and Ippolito Bentivoglio approached this from a carnivalesque point of view, emphasizing the comedy, the masquerade and the (homo-)erotic aspects of it. Others like Metastasio or Paolo Rolli more focused on the failed struggle to conceal the masculinity of the archetypical hero Achilles, and how the inherent nature of the person is stronger than the nurture he receives.

Well known composers writing an opera on this theme include Domenico Scarlatti with his 1712 Tetide in Sciro, John Gay's 1733 Achilles, and Georg Friedrich Händel in 1741 with Deidamia.

=== Literature ===
- Ca. 1st century BCE: Epithalamium of Achilles and Deidameia, anonymous, sometimes ascribed to Bion of Smyrna
- 1st century CE: Achilleid by Statius
- 2nd century CE: The Speech of the Embassy to Achilles (Op. 16 Behr) by Aelius Aristides, section 17 (Behr)
- 11th century: Deidamia Achilli, an anonymous Ovidian epistle from Deidamia to Achilles
- 14th century: the story is mentioned in the Divine Comedy by Dante, Purgatorio chapter 9, verse 34–42
- 1611: El Aquiles by Tirso de Molina
- 1667: El monstruo de los jardines The Monster of the Gardens by Calderon de la Barca
- 1805: Achille à Scyros by Jean-Charles-Julien Luce de Lancival
- 1890, Achilles in Scyros by Robert Bridges (2nd edition 1892)
- 1935: Achille ou le mensonge by Marguerite Yourcenar, also published as Déidamie
- 1995: "Achilles Speaks of His Deception in the Court of Lykomedes" by Michael Martone, first published in The American Voice, pp. 80–82. Republished in Four for a Quarter: Fictions, pp. 135–137. Martone read the story at the Knox Writers House.
- 1998: the story of Achilles on Skyros is included in the Age of Bronze comics by Eric Shanower
- 2011: a version of this story is included in the contemporary historical fiction novel The Song of Achilles by Madeline Miller.
- 2022: Wrath Goddess Sing by Maya Deane imagines Achilles on Skyros as a transgender woman.

=== Visual arts ===
==== Paintings ====
Niccolò Bambini, Achilles at Skyros

- 5th century BCE, Achilles in Skyros by Polygnotus
- 4th or 3rd century BCE: Athenion of Maroneia painted an image of Odysseus discovering Achilles in a maiden's clothing
- 1st century CE: the Chamber of Achilles on Skyros, decorated with frescoes, in the Domus Aurea
- 1st century CE: anonymous wall-paintings of Achilles in Skyros in the Casa dei Dioscuri (Castor and Pollux) and other places in Pompei
- Early 17th century: Odysseus recognises Achilles (disguised as a woman) amongst the daughters of Lycomedes by Frans Francken the Younger
- Mid 17th century: Achilles among the Daughters of Lycomedes by Pietro Paolini, Getty Museum, Los Angeles
- 1649–1650: Nicolas Poussin, Discovery of Achilles on Skyros
- 1656: Nicolas Poussin, Achilles on Skyros
- 1664: Achilles discovered by Ulysses by Jan de Bray
- 17th century: Achilles and Ulysses Leaving Skyros by Claude François
- Niccolò Bambini, Achilles at Skyros
- Pieter van Lint, Achilles among the Daughters of Lycomedes, The Israel Museum, Jerusalem
- Giovanni Pietro Bellori, 2 paintings of Achilles in Skyros, one now in the Museum of Fine Arts, Boston, one in the Virginia Museum of Fine Arts, Richmond
- 18th century: Achilles at the Court of King Lycomedes with His Daughters by Pompeo Batoni
- Angelica Kauffmann painted several versions of the subject, 1769: Ulysses Discovering Achilles (National Trust, Saltram House); in 1786: Achilles Discover'd by Ulysses (engraving after Kauffmann); and in 1787/88, Achilles Discovered Among the Daughters of Lycomedes (National Gallery, London)

==== Tapestries ====
- Mid 18th century: Achille chez les filles de lycomède à Skyros, reconnu par Ulysse, now kept in the Hôtel de Soubise

==== Mosaics ====
- Achilles on Skyros, mosaic from Zeugma, Commagene
- "Achilles at Skyros discovered by Ulysses", mosaic from [(Villa Romana La Olmeda, Spain)]

==== Sculptures ====
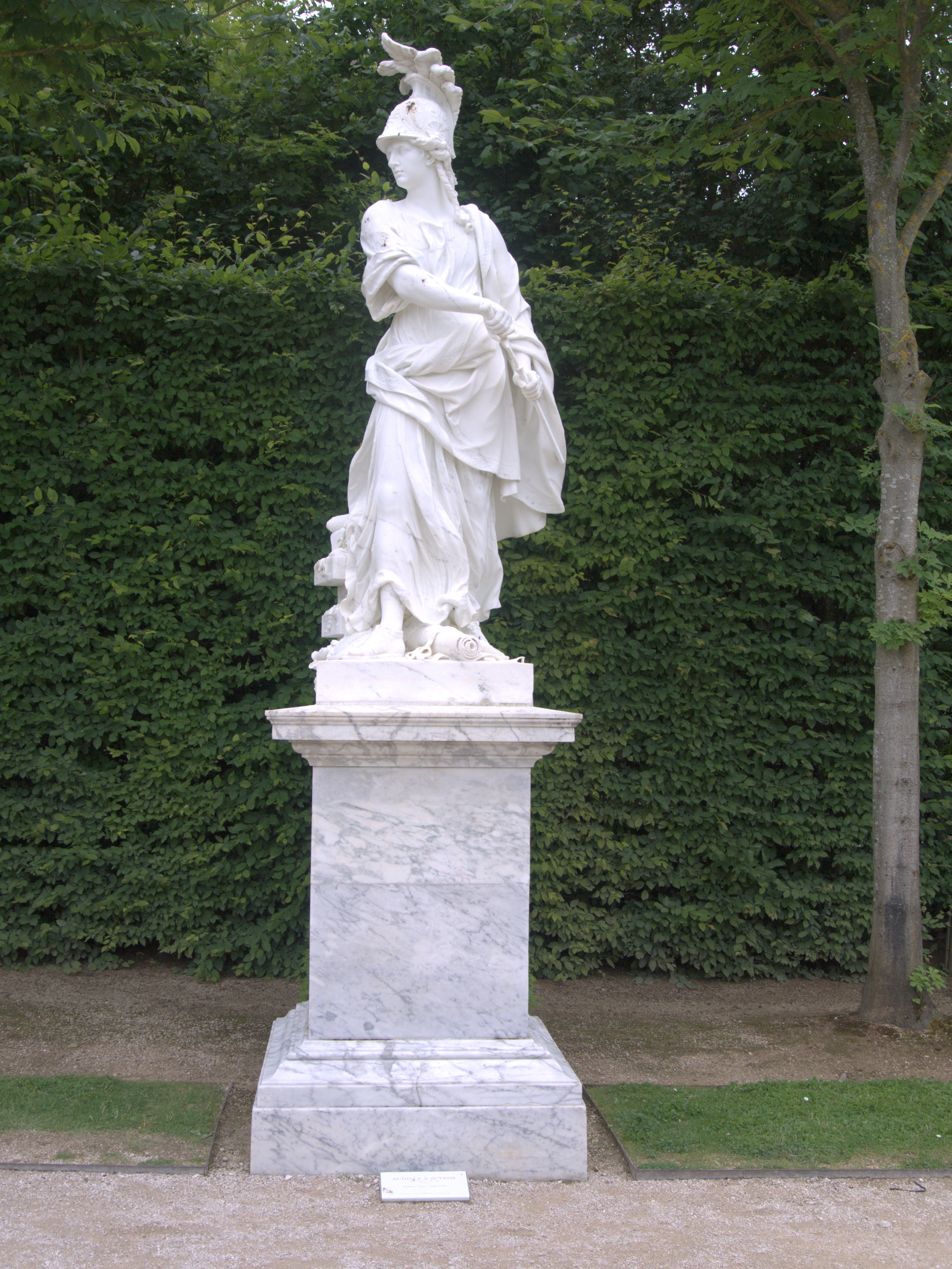
Achille à Scyros by Philibert Vigier, in the Gardens of Versailles

- 1695: Achille à Scyros by Philibert Vigier, located at the Tapis Vert of the Gardens of Versailles

=== Stage ===
==== Plays ====
- 5th century BC: Skyrioi by Euripides (lost, but described as a play about Achilles hiding on Skyros)
- 1612: El Aquiles by Tirso de Molina
- Ca. 1640: El caballero dama (The Gentleman as a Lady) by Cristóbal de Monroy y Silva
- 1653: El monstruo de los jardines (The Monster of the Gardens) by Pedro Calderón de la Barca

==== Opera ====
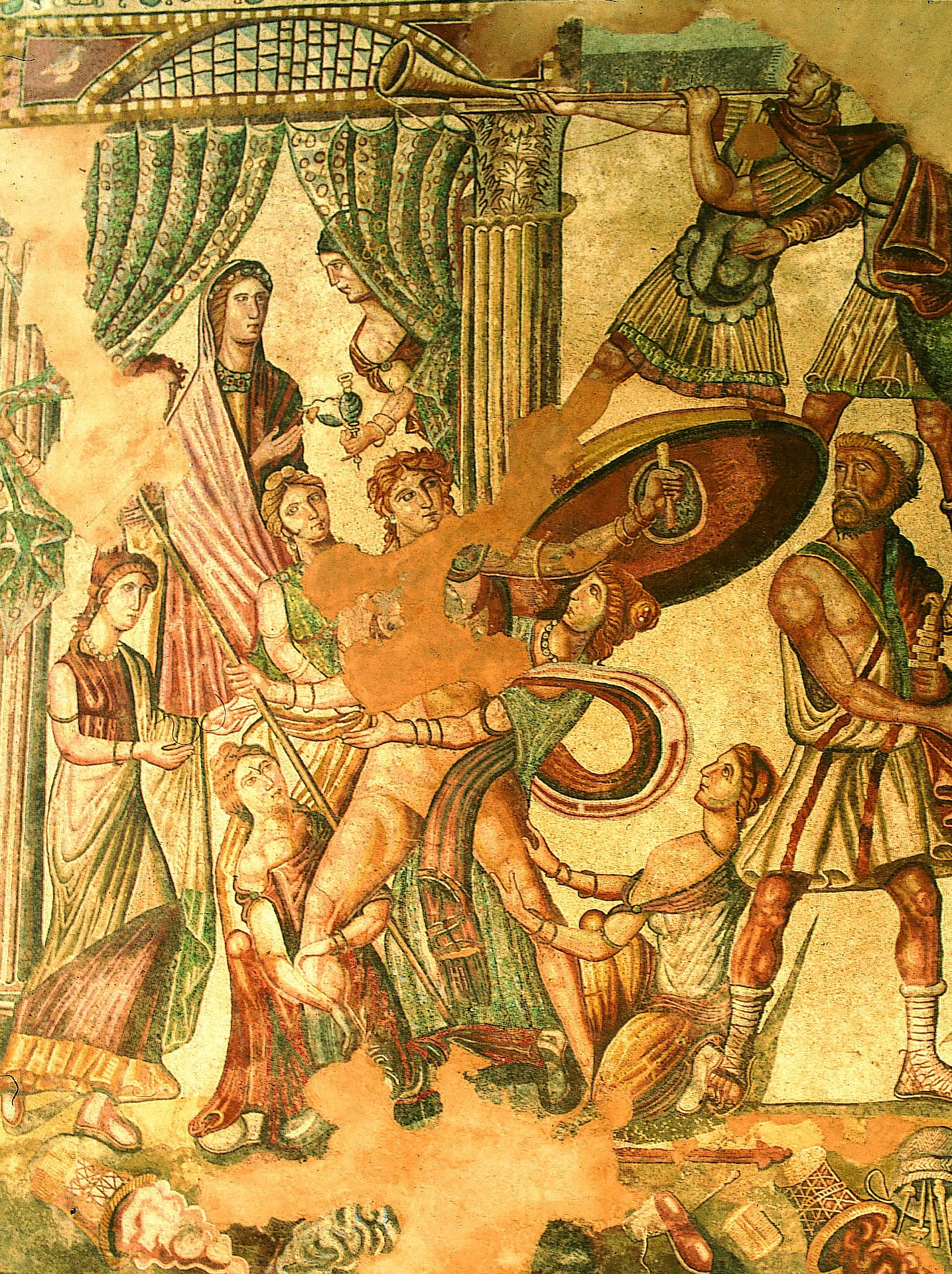
Achilles being adored by princesses of Skyros; late Roman mosaic from La Olmeda, Spain, 4th–5th centuries AD

- 1641: La finta pazza by Francesco Sacrati (music) and Giulio Strozzi (libretto)
- 1663: Achille in Sciro by Giovanni Legrenzi (music) and Ippolito Bentivoglio (libretto)
- 1663: Achille in Sciro by Antonio Draghi (music) and Cav. Ximenez (libretto)
- 1712: Tetide in Sciro by Domenico Scarlatti (music) and Carlo Sigismondo Capece (libretto)
- 1727: Achille in Sciro, anonymous work performed at the opera house of Franz Anton von Sporck in Prague, and probably based on the Bentivoglio libretto
- 1733: Achilles by John Gay
- 1735: Achille et Déidamie by André Campra (music) and Antoine Danchet (libretto)
- 1736: Achille in Sciro by Antonio Caldara (music) and Metastasio (libretto)
- 1737: Achille in Sciro by Domenico Sarro (music) and Metastasio (libretto)
- 1738:Achille in Sciro by Giuseppe Arena (music) and Metastasio (libretto)
- 1739: Achille in Sciro by Pietro Chiarini (music) and Metastasio (libretto) (adapted by Bartolomeo Vitturi
- 1740: Achille in Sciro by Leonardo Leo
- 1741: Deidamia by George Frideric Handel (music) and Paolo Antonio Rolli (libretto)
- 1744: Achille in Sciro by Francesco Corselli (music) and Metastasio (libretto)
- 1745: Achille in Sciro by Gennaro Manna (music) and Metastasio (libretto)
- 1747: Achille in Sciro by Giovanni Battista Runcher (music) and Metastasio (libretto)
- 1749: Achille in Sciro by Niccolò Jommelli (music) and Metastasio (libretto)
- 1751: Achille in Sciro by Gregorio Sciroli (music) and Metastasio (libretto)
- 1754: Achille in Sciro by Antonio Maria Mazzoni (music) and Metastasio (libretto)
- 1759: Achille in Sciro by Johann Adolph Hasse (music) and Metastasio (libretto)
- 1759: Achille in Sciro by Giuseppe Sarti (music) and Metastasio (libretto)
- 1764: Achille in Sciro by Ferdinando Giuseppe Bertoni (music)
- 1765: Achille in Sciro by Johann Friedrich Agricola (music) and Metastasio (libretto)
- 1766: Achille in Sciro by Florian Leopold Gassmann (music) and Metastasio (libretto)
- 1767: L'Achille in Sciro by Johann Gottlieb Naumann (music) and Metastasio (libretto)
- 1772: Aquiles en Esciros by Antonio Amicone (music) and Metastasio (libretto)
- 1773: Achilles in Petticaots by Thomas Arne (music) and John Gay (libretto)
- 1774: Achille in Sciro by Pasquale Anfossi (music) and Metastasio (libretto)
- 1774: Achille in Sciro by Pietro Pompeo Sales (music) and Metastasio (libretto)
- 1778: Achille in Sciro by Giovanni Paisiello (music) and Metastasio (libretto)
- 1785: Achille in Sciro by Gaetano Pugnani (music) and Metastasio (libretto)
- 1794: Achille in Sciro by Marcello Bernardini and Metastasio (libretto)
- 1800: Achille in Sciro: Commedia dramatica per musica, libretto by Publio Quintiliano Settimio
- 1825: Achille in Sciro by Pietro Antonio Coppola (music) and Rapisarda (libretto)
- 1857: Achille à Scyros by François Anatole Laurent de Rillé (operette)

==== Ballet ====
- 1804: Achille à Scyros by Pierre Gardel (ballet) and Luigi Cherubini (music)
- 1830: Achilles at Scyros by Carlo Blasis
- 1921, Achilles auf Skyros by Egon Wellesz (music) after Hugo von Hofmannsthal
