= Angelo Maria Amorevoli =

Italian opera singer

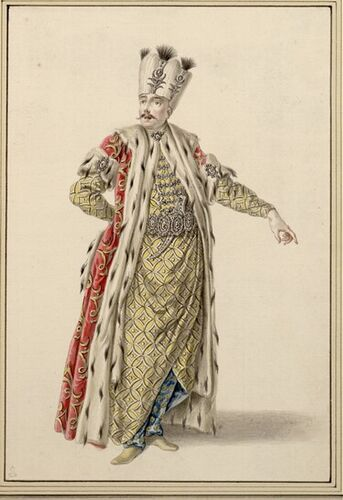
- Angelo Amorevoli as Solimano (1753)
- Born: 16 September 1716; Venice, Republic of Venice
- Died: 15 November 1798 (aged 82); Dresden, Electorate of Saxony
- Occupation: Opera singer (tenor)
- Years active: 1729–1771

Angelo Maria Amorevoli (16 September 1716 – 15 November 1798) was a leading Italian tenor in Baroque opera.

== Biography ==
Angelo Amorevoli began singing in opera seria when he was just thirteen: in 1729 he sang in revivals of the musical dramas, Amore e gratitudine, probably by Flavio Carlo Lanciani, and Ottone in villa by Antonio Vivaldi. The following year he was on the stage in Rome for Porpora’s operas Mitridate and Siface, and in Venice for Hasse’s Dalisa. From 1731 to 1735 he took part in major operatic productions in Turin, Milan, and other towns of northern Italy. From 1736 to 1740 he moved to Naples, where he took part in eleven premières, one of which was Sarro’s Achille in Sciro, the drama that inaugurated the Teatro di San Carlo on 4 November 1737.

In 1739 he traveled to Vienna, where he attracted a lot of attention, primarily with his interpretation of Vivaldi's Feraspe. On 26 December 1740 he took part in the inauguration of the new Teatro Regio in Turin, performing the part of Mitrane in Francesco Feo's Arsace. In 1741 he made his debut both in Florence, and in London, where he sang several productions at the King's Theatre from October 1741 to May 1743. He returned to Italy from 1744 to 1745 where he was on the stage in Milan. He resolved to move to Dresden in order to be given the chance of singing in Hasse's operas. There, the Hamburg composer would give him the satisfaction of performing the title role in his opera Solimano which was premièred in 1753.

In 1748 Amorevoli visited Vienna again, and there he met the celebrated librettist and great poet Pietro Metastasio, who highly commended his singing ability, and took part in a third theatre inauguration, at the Burgtheater, singing in Gluck's La Semiramide Riconosciuta (Ircano). He then lived in Milan again from 1748 to 1749 and from 1759 to 1764, the year he decided to retire from the stage. Returned definitively to Dresden, he was engaged by the Saxon Court, but only as a chamber and Church singer, which posts he held until about 1771. He died in Dresden in 1798.

== Artistic features ==
Angelo Amorevoli is considered one of the greatest tenors in the first half of the 18th century's European operatic scene and the leader, together with Annibale Pio Fabri (and Francesco Borosini), of tenor revenge in the world of Baroque music drama. Before them, the tenor, which used to show marked baritonal characteristics, was employed in third leading parts, in buffo roles, often interpreting en travesti figures of old women. With the coming of the new tenor class led by Amorevoli, things changed: the vocal range and tessitura employed remained substantially baritonal, reaching the summit of B4 flat. The main change, however, was the unheard-of coloratura virtuosity the new tenor class proved themselves equal to, which enabled the tenors to achieve a real breakthrough, finally conquering leading roles in Baroque operas. These included great roles of fathers, commanders, antagonists villains (the same kind of roles that would later become peculiar to the modern baritone). In this new field, Amorevoli took the lead wherever in Europe he sang, and with the greatest musicians of his era, including Vivaldi and Hasse. Amorevoli worked with Hasse in Dresden for many years. Their collaboration culminated with Segeste's allegro, Solcar pensa un mar sicuro, from the version of Arminio produced in that town in 1745, which was the most acrobatic coloratura aria of tempest that had ever, up to that time, been granted to a male voice.

== Roles created ==
The following list is not complete.

- Casaglia, Gherardo (2005). "Angelo Amorevoli". L'Almanacco di Gherardo Casaglia (in Italian).

Role	Opera	Genre	Composer	Theatre	Première's date
Massimo	Ezio	dramma per musica	Riccardo Broschi	Turin, Teatro Regio	26 December 1730
Ulisse	Achille in Sciro	dramma per musica (opera seria)	Domenico Natale Sarro	Naples, Nuovo Grande Real Teatro San Carlo (inauguration)	4 November 1737
Clistene	L'Olimpiade	dramma per musica	Leonardo Leo	Naples, Nuovo Grande Real Teatro San Carlo	19 December 1737
Lycas/Giove	Le nozze di Psiche con Amore	festa teatrale	Leonardo Leo	Naples, Nuovo Grande Real Teatro San Carlo	23 June 1738
Fenicio	Demetrio	opera eroica (pasticcio, 3rd version)	Leonardo Leo (Acts 1 and partly 2), Lorenzo Fago, Gian Francesco de Majo, Nicola Bonifacio Logroscino (Act 2), Riccardo Broschi (Act 3)	Naples, Nuovo Grande Real Teatro San Carlo	30 June 1738
Osroa	Adriano in Siria	dramma per musica	Giovanni Alberto Ristori	Naples, Real Teatro San Carlo	19 December 1739
Latino	Il trionfo di Camilla	dramma per musica (opera eroica, 1st version)	Nicola Porpora	Naples, Real Teatro San Carlo	20 January 1740
Mitrane	Arsace	opera seriain 3 atti	Francesco Feo	Turin, Nuovo Teatro Regio (inauguration)	26 December 1740
Artabano	Artaserse	dramma per musica	Giuseppe Arena	Turin, Nuovo Teatro Regio	21 January 1741
Ircano	La Semiramide riconosciuta	dramma per musica	Christoph Willibald Gluck	Vienna, Burgtheater (Theater nächst der Burg, Theater bei der Hofburg, Hofburg-Theater, Kaiserlische Königliche National Hoftheater) (inauguration)	14 May 1748
Manlio	Attilio Regolo	dramma per musica	Johann Adolf Hasse	Dresden, Grosses Königliches Opernhaus am Zwingerhof (Hoftheater)	12 January 1750
Dafni	Euridice	favola pastorale per musica (pasticcio)	Niccolò Jommelli, Andrea Bernasconi, Georg Christoph Wagenseil, Ignaz Holzbauer, Johann Adolf Hasse and Baldassarre Galuppi	Vienna, Hof-Burgtheater	26 July 1750
Solimano	Solimano	dramma per musica (1st version)	Johann Adolf Hasse	Dresden, Grosses Königliches Opernhaus am Zwingerhof (Hoftheater)	5 February 1753

== Sources ==
- G. Zechmeister: Die Wiener Theater nächst der Burg und nächst dem Kärntnertor von 1747 bis 1776 (Vienna, 1971)
- R. Celletti: Storia del belcanto, Discanto Edizioni, Fiesole, 1983, passim
- E. Selfridge-Field: Pallade veneta: Writings on Music in Venetian Society 1650–1750, p. 310 (Venice, 1985)
- W.C. Holmes: Opera Observed: Views of a Florentine Impresario in the Early Eighteenth Century (Chicago, 1993)
- S. Mamy: Les grands castrats napolitains à Venise au XVIIIe siècle, pp. 41, 120 (Liège, 1994)
- S. Caruselli (a cura di), Grande enciclopedia della musica lirica, Longanesi &C. Periodici S.p.A., Rome, Vol. 4, p. 1196/1197
- S. Hansell, K. Lipton: New Grove Dictionary of Music and Musicians, ad nomen
- This article contains substantial material translated from Angelo Amorevoli in the Italian Wikipedia.
