= The Song of Achilles =

2011 novel by Madeline Miller

- Hardback edition cover
- Author: Madeline Miller
- Language: English
- Genre: Romance; Fantasy
- Set in: Greek Heroic Age
- Published: September 20, 2011
- Publisher: Ecco Press (HarperCollins)
- Publication place: United States
- Pages: 416
- ISBN: 978-0062060624
- OCLC: 773303923
- Dewey Decimal: 918.3

The Song of Achilles is a 2011 novel by American writer Madeline Miller. Set during the Greek Heroic Age, it is a retelling of the Trojan War as told from the perspective of Patroclus. The novel follows Patroclus' relationship with Achilles, from their initial meeting to their exploits during the Trojan War, with focus on their romantic relationship. In 2012, The Song of Achilles was awarded the Orange Prize for Fiction.

== Plot ==
The book is narrated by Patroclus, the son of King Menoetius. He is presented as a potential suitor to Helen of Troy. He is then obliged to take a blood oath in defense of her marriage to Menelaus. After Patroclus accidentally kills the son of one of his father's nobles after said son attacked him, he is exiled to Phthia, where he meets Achilles, the only son of Phthia's king, Peleus, and the sea nymph Thetis. They become close friends, and Patroclus develops feelings for Achilles. Convinced that a mortal of low status is an unsuitable companion for her son, Thetis attempts to separate the pair by sending Achilles to train under Chiron.

Patroclus thwarts the plan by running away to join Achilles on Mount Pelion. As he matures, he struggles to hide his deepening attraction to the demigod. Achilles reciprocates and they have sex, establishing their romantic relationship despite Thetis' attempts to separate them. Soon the Mycenaean king, Agamemnon, calls on the various Achaeans to join his military campaign against Troy, whose prince Paris has kidnapped his brother Menelaus's wife, Helen. As a prophecy foretells that Achilles will die in Troy after the death of the Trojan prince Hector, Thetis hides Achilles on Skyros in the guise of a woman in the court of King Lycomedes; she forces him to marry Lycomedes's daughter Deidamia, who later bears Achilles's son Neoptolemus, also known as Pyrrhus.

Patroclus follows Achilles to Skyros, where they live until they are discovered by Odysseus and Diomedes. Patroclus is obligated to join the war in Troy as a result of his blood oath, while Achilles joins after vowing that he will never fight Hector in order to avoid his prophesied death. Upon joining the Achaean forces, tensions escalate between Achilles and Agamemnon: first when Agamemnon sacrifices his daughter Iphigenia in order to appease Artemis and later when Achilles takes the Trojan woman Briseis as a war prize to save her from Agamemnon. However, out of sensitivity, Achilles largely avoids interacting with Briseis directly because he had killed the men in her family, but she and Patroclus develop a close friendship verging on romance, ultimately settling into a devoted sibling relationship.

After nine years, Chryseis is claimed by Agamemnon. Soon after, her father, Chryses, tries to pay for her release, which Agamemnon refuses. Chryses appeals to Apollo, who unleashes a plague that decimates the Achaeans; when Agamemnon refuses Achilles's demand to return Chryseis, he doubles down by blaming Achilles for the war's length, by his unwillingness to face and kill Hector. As punishment, he orders that Briseis be taken from Achilles and brought to him, which offends Achilles, who vows to remove himself and his army from the fight until this slight at his honor is repaired.

Achilles begs his mother to avenge him by punishing the Achaean soldiers who had wronged him and precipitate the Greeks' need for him; Thetis convinces Zeus to tip the war in favor of the Trojans so that the Achaeans will regret having antagonized Achilles, and the Achaeans suffer from a deadly plague. Tensions flare between Achilles and Patroclus when Achilles refuses to accept a private arrangement where Briseis is returned to him, along with valuable gifts. He stubbornly demands a public apology, refusing to come to the aid of the Greeks, who are on the verge of defeat.

Patroclus, who has grown close to the soldiers as a field medic and sympathizes with their losses, attempts and fails to convince Achilles to rejoin the battle. Instead, Patroclus impersonates Achilles by donning his armor and leads his men into battle; the offensive forces a Trojan retreat. During the battle, Patroclus killed Sarpedon and Apollo causes Patroclus to reveal himself. Patroclus is killed by Hector, and his body is brought to Achilles.

Achilles grieves along with Briseis and demands Patroclus's ashes be mixed with his own when he dies. Having lost his will to live, Achilles returns to battle and kills Hector to avenge Patroclus. After he is in turn killed by Paris with the divine help of Apollo, his ashes are mixed with Patroclus's, per his request, and are buried. Neoptolemus comes to take Achilles's place and kills Briseis when she refuses his advances and reveals Achilles and Patroclus's relationship. The Achaeans erect a tomb for Achilles and Patroclus but do not inscribe Patroclus's name at the behest of Neoptolemus. Patroclus's shade is thus unable to pass into the underworld and is bound to the tomb. After the war, Thetis returns and grieves for Achilles. She and Patroclus share memories of the fallen hero, and Thetis relents, writing Patroclus's name upon the tomb. Patroclus is now able to pass into the afterlife, where he and Achilles reunite.

== Development and publication ==
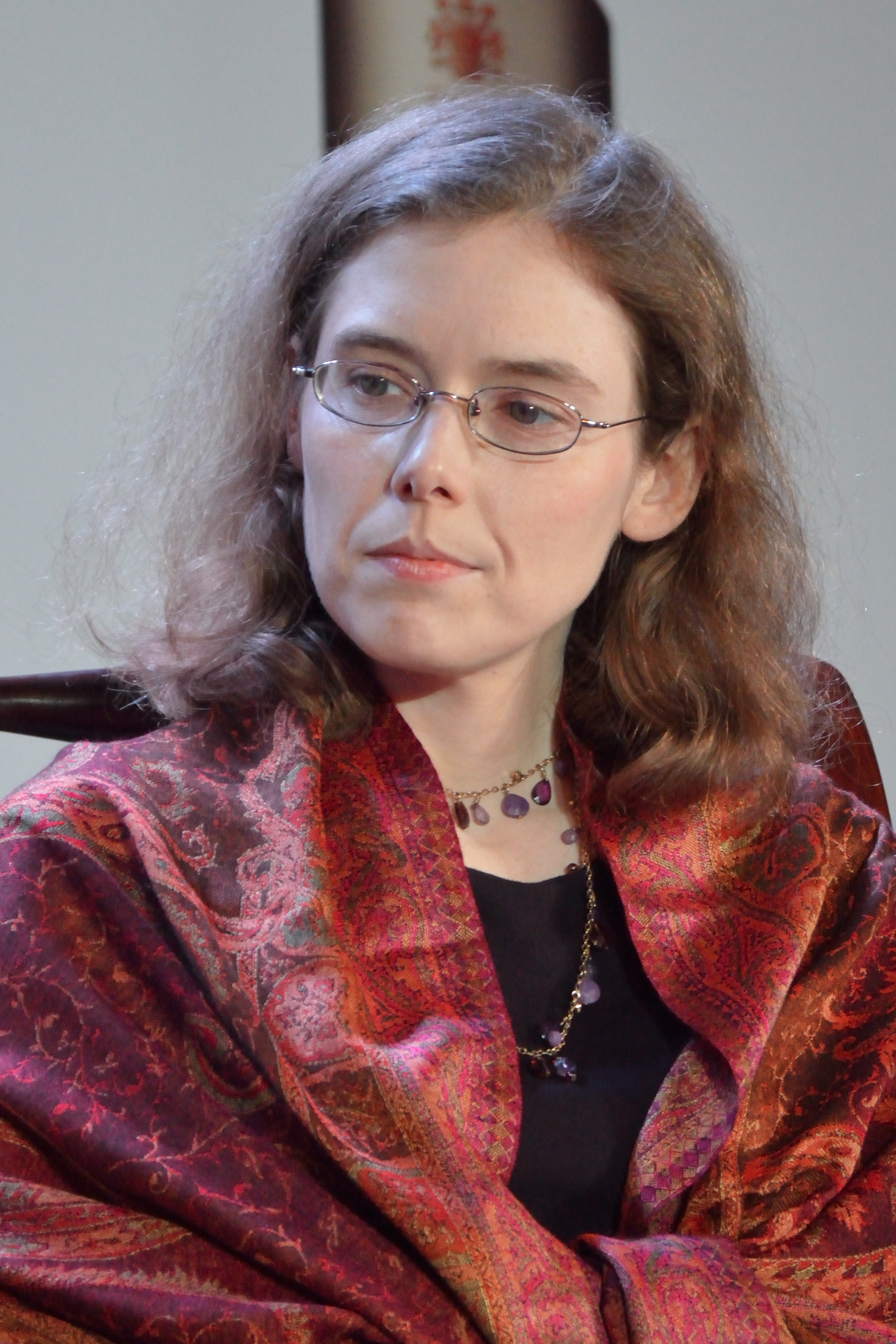
Miller in Kolkata in 2013

Miller developed an interest in the legend of Achilles after her mother read the Iliad to her as a child. She found that she was particularly intrigued by Patroclus, a minor character who ultimately has a significant influence on the outcome of the Trojan War. Drawing from this source material, Miller sought to write a story about who Patroclus was and what he meant to Achilles. In addition to the Iliad, Miller drew inspiration from the writings of Ovid, Virgil, Sophocles, Apollodorus, Euripides, and Aeschylus, as well as accounts of Achilles's childhood friendship with Patroclus and his martial training. On the depiction of Achilles and Patroclus as lovers, Miller reminded:

The idea that Patroclus and Achilles were lovers is quite old. Many Greco-Roman authors read their relationship as a romantic one—it was a common and accepted interpretation in the ancient world. We even have a fragment from a lost tragedy of Aeschylus, where Achilles speaks of his and Patroclus' 'frequent kisses.' There is a lot of support for their relationship in the text of the Iliad itself, though Homer never makes it explicit. For me, the most compelling piece of evidence, aside from the depth of Achilles' grief, is how he grieves: Achilles refuses to burn Patroclus' body, insisting instead on keeping the corpse in his tent, where he constantly weeps and embraces it—despite the horrified reactions of those around him. That sense of physical devastation spoke deeply to me of a true and total intimacy between the two men.

Miller depicts Achilles and Patroclus as the same age, contrasting Homer's depiction of Patroclus as significantly older than Achilles. Miller drew inspiration for this departure from the Achilleid by Statius, stating, "To me, the two have always resonated as peers, so that was the tradition I followed." The Song of Achilles took Miller ten years to write; after discarding a completed manuscript five years into her writing, she started again from scratch, struggling to perfect the voice of her narrator. The Song of Achilles was published as Miller's debut novel on September 20, 2011, by Ecco Press, an imprint of HarperCollins.

== Reception ==
As of July 2022, The Song of Achilles has sold 2 million copies across various formats. The book's sales received a significant boost in 2021 after it was featured in a TikTok video, cited by The New York Times as an example of how "BookTok" and viral social media videos increasingly drive sales of literature.

Reviewing The Song of Achilles for The Guardian, Natalie Haynes commended the novel as "more poetic than almost any translation of Homer" and "a deeply affecting version of the Achilles story." Mary Doria Russell similarly praised the novel in her review for The Washington Post, favorably citing its "prose as clean and spare as the driving poetry of Homer." In his review for The Dallas Morning News, Brian Woolley stated "Even for a scholar of Greek literature, which Miller is, rewriting the Western world's first and greatest war novel is an awesome task to undertake. That she did it with such grace, style and suspense is astonishing."

== Awards ==
In 2012, The Song of Achilles was awarded the 17th annual Women's Prize for Fiction, then called the Orange Prize. Carolyn Kellogg of the Los Angeles Times wrote that it was a surprise win, with Miller being "the dark horse in this year's race". Joanna Trollope, chair of the judges, commented, "This is a more than worthy winner—original, passionate, inventive and uplifting. Homer would be proud of her."

The novel was also shortlisted for the 2013 Stonewall Book Award and the 2013 Chautauqua Prize.

| Year | Award | Category | Result | Ref. |
|---|---|---|---|---|
| 2012 | Orange Prize for Fiction | — | Won | |
| 2013 | ALA Rainbow Book List | Young Adult/Crossover Fiction | Top Ten | |
| 2013 | Chautauqua Prize | — | Shortlisted | |
| 2013 | Gaylactic Spectrum Award | Novel | Won | |
| 2013 | Independent Booksellers' Book Prize | — | Shortlisted | |
| 2013 | Massachusetts Book Award | Must-Read | Longlisted | |
| 2013 | RUSA CODES Reading List | Historical Fiction | Shortlisted | |
| 2013 | Stonewall Book Award | Literature | Honor | |

== See also ==
- The Silence of the Girls
- Wrath Goddess Sing
