= Wrath Goddess Sing =

2022 novel by Maya Deane

- Author: Maya Deane
- Genre: Historical fantasy, Transgender literature
- Publisher: William Morrow
- Publication date: June 7, 2022
- Pages: 464
- ISBN: 978-0-06-316118-4

Wrath Goddess Sing is Maya Deane's debut novel, published in 2022. It retells the myth of Achilles' time on Skyros and fighting in the Iliad while featuring Achilles' perspective as a trans woman. The book was shortlisted for the 2023 Crawford Award and a finalist for the 2023 Lambda Literary Award for Transgender Fiction.

== Plot ==
In the novel, Achilles is living in hiding on the island of Skyros with her lover Princess Deidamia and the kallai, transgender priestesses of Aphrodite. Achilles is trans as well, and learning to use herbs to medically transition. However, war begins when Prince Alaksandu steals Helen from her husband, King Menelaos. A prophecy declares that Achilles is the only warrior who can defeat Alaksandu, and Odysseus and Diomedes come looking for her. Achilles does not want to abandon Deidamia, nor stop her transition by leaving to fight. However, Athena asks her to join the war, transforming her body and giving her a womb in return for her cooperation.

Achilles sails with Agamemnon's fleet to Wilusa, and reunites with her cousin Patroklos and his wife, the Egyptian sorceress Meryapi. Achilles tries to rescue Helen but realizes that Helen does not need rescuing: she initiated the war. As an immortal demigoddess, she has grown more powerful due to the bloodshed, and she hopes to build up enough strength to remake the world alongside the exiled Zeus. Helen becomes obsessed with Achilles, while other gods seek to take advantage of Helen's maneuvering.

== Creation ==
Around 2017, Maya Deane thought of telling the story of Achilles as a trans woman. She was inspired by older tales where Achilles was presented as a woman, but these tales had been suppressed in the 20th century. Deane had previously transitioned and felt the absence of trans literature, especially due to the censorship of trans themes in existing literature. She wanted to retell the Iliad to resurrect these elements of the tale.

== Publication ==
Wrath Goddess Sing was published by William Morrow in June 2022.

== Reception ==
Wrath Goddess Sing was shortlisted for the 2023 Crawford Award. It was also a finalist for the 2023 Lambda Literary Award for Transgender Fiction.

Publishers Weekly gave the book a starred review, praising the characters, setting and epic plot. They noted the good representation fulfilled by many LGBTQ characters. Kirkus enjoyed the new retelling but found the prose awkward sometimes. By contrast, Mya Alexice, for Bookpage, enjoyed the prose's lyricism. Alexice praised the imaginative portrayals of the gods and the characterizations of human characters. Fabienne Schwizer, for Grimdark Magazine, enjoyed the book, especially its imagination and power to create discussion. Schwizer praised the writing and characters but was frustrated by elements like unfamiliar names for key Iliad characters. Eileen Charbonneau, for Historical Novels Review, highly recommended the book as a "tour de force not to be missed".

In "Classical Studies, Trans Joy, and Reparative Reading in 'Wrath Goddess Sing'", Hannah Steele argues that Wrath Goddess Sing is a "reparative historiography grounded in trans joy that challenges the history of erasing and suppressing queerness in Classical receptions".

== See also ==
- The Song of Achilles
- The Sapling Cage
- The Library Thief
- Some Desperate Glory
- Fierce Femmes and Notorious Liars
