= Achille in Sciro (Sarro) =

Opera by Domenico Sarro

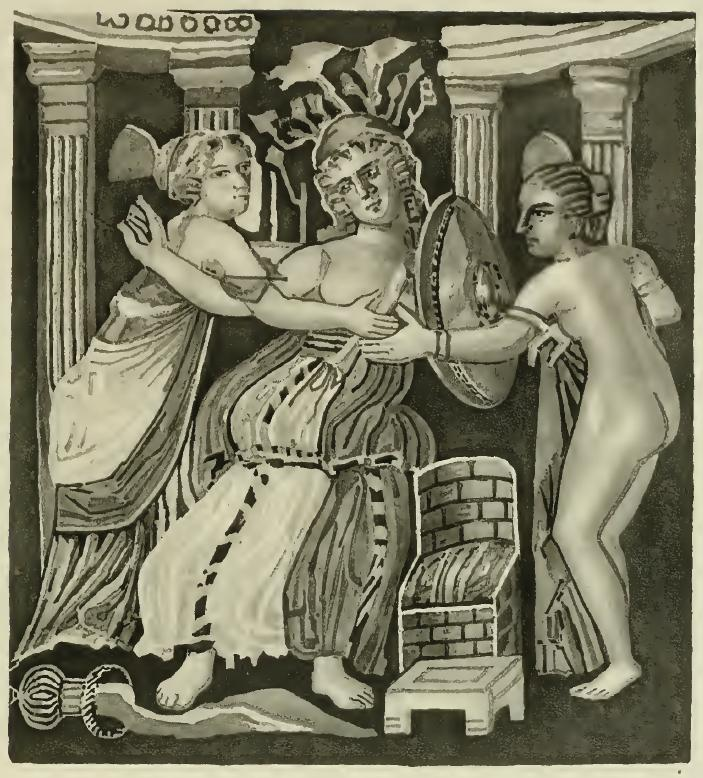
Spartan mosaic depicting Achilles at Skyros

Achille in Sciro is an opera seria by composer Domenico Sarro. The opera uses an Italian language libretto by Pietro Metastasio. It was commissioned for the opening of the Teatro di San Carlo by King Charles VII of Naples, later known as Charles III of Spain. The work premiered at the inauguration of the theatre on 4 November 1737, Charles's name day. It is based on the story of Achilles on Skyros.

The opera was not performed for more than 250 years until it was revived at the Festival della Valle d'Itria in 2007. That performance was recorded live and released on CD by Dynamic Records in 2008. The cast was as follows:

- Achille: Gabriella Martellacci
- Lycomedes: Marcello Nardis
- Teagene: Massimiliano Arizzi
- Deidamia: Maria Laura Martorana
- Ulysses: Francisco Ruben Brito
- Nearco: Eufemia Tufano
- Arcade: Dolores Carlucci
- Orchestra Internazionale d’Italia
- Bratislava Chamber Choir
- Conductor: Federico Maria Sardelli
- Director: Davide Livermore

Metastasio's libretto Achille in Sciro was first set by Antonio Caldara (1736, Vienna).

== Recordings ==
- Federico Maria Sardelli Dynamic 3CD
