= Deidamia Achilli =

The opening lines of Deidamia Achilli in the Paris manuscript: Legitimam nuptam si dici fas sit amicam, Haec tibi casta suo mittit amica viro. Si legis, Aeacide, mittentis verba puellae, Perlege missa tibi! Mitte legenda michi, Mitte legenda tuo cara cum coniuge nato! Mittere vel noli verba, sed ipse veni!

Deidamia Achilli is an anonymous 11th-century Latin poem of 65 elegiac distichs in the form of a letter from Deidamia to her husband Achilles, set about four years after the events on Skyros, when he abandoned her to fight at Troy. It forms part of the medieval Matter of Troy.

== Composition ==
Deidamia Achilli was probably written in France towards the middle or end of the 11th century. The earliest manuscript of the poem was copied in France around 1100. The poet may have been a member of the Loire circle and an influence on Baudri of Bourgueil, who himself was probably writing in 1080–1107.

== Intertextuality ==
The poem is heavily indebted to Ovid's Heroides and Statius' Achilleid. It is a form of "pairing and response". It responds to Statius and pairs with Ovid. The character of Deidamia is taken from her portrayal in the Achilleid, but the form of the poem is Ovidian. Many of Deidamia's "reproaches are direct responses to reassurances, promises etc. given by Achilles in Statius' epic." The poet "is following Ovid's trend of giving a voice to a woman who has been silenced or but dimly heard in the literary tradition," even imagining "what Ovid might have written had he lived long enough to read Statius's Achilleid." The poet may be responding specifically to one of Deidamia's lines in the Achilleid, where she wonders if "concealed, I shall lie hidden," not even gossiped about by the servants.

The poem in itself serves as a counterpart to Heroides 3, a letter addressed to Achilles by Briseis, the woman who replaced Deidamia in his affections before likewise losing him. The poet may have sought to complete the pair, since Ovid himself created two such pairs: Heroides 6 (Hypsipyle) and 12 (Medea), two women abandoned by Jason, and Heroides 5 (Oenone) and 17 (Helen), two women abandoned by Paris. Deidamia Achilli and Heroides 3 date to the same moment and respond to the same event, Achilles' quarrel with Agamemnon. Since she is writing from Skyros, however, Deidamia is unaware that Agamemnon has taken Briseis away from Achilles.

Deidamia Achilli relies on its readers' knowledge of the whole story of the Trojan War to create tension and dramatic irony. Deidamia worries that Achilles will never return to her because of Briseis but hopes that he will kill Hector. In fact, as the reader knows, he never returns because he is killed by Paris in revenge for the death of Hector. Deidamia also emphasises her status as Achilles' lawful wife, although she was his mistress prior to that and they were only wed the night before he left for Troy. According to Ruth Parkes, "critics have been persuaded by her rhetoric" into seeing the poem as an exercise in Christian moralizing on marital and extramarital love. Suzanne Hagedorn emphasises the superior skill of the poet in bringing out the moral of the story ("lawful wife" over "barbarian mistress") as compared to medieval commentators on Ovid.

== Transmission ==
Deidamia Achilli is preserved at least partially in three manuscripts. The earliest manuscript is Stockholm, Kungliga Biblioteket, Va 26a, but it is incomplete. The text in Oxford, Bodleian Library, Auct. F. 1. 17 is also incomplete. The only complete text is found in Paris, Bibliothèque nationale de France, lat. 2782. A partial edition of the text first appeared in 1879. The whole text has been critically edited by Jürgen Stohlmann (1973) and translated into English by Ruth Parkes.

== Sources ==
- Hagedorn, Suzanne C. (2004). Abandoned Women: Rewriting the Classics in Dante, Boccaccio, and Chaucer. University of Michigan Press.
- Kretschmer, Marek Thue (2024). "The Matter of Troy in Medieval Latin Poetry (ca.1060–ca.1230)". In Francesco Stella; Lucie Doležalová; Danuta Shanzer (eds.). Latin Literatures of Medieval and Early Modern Times in Europe and Beyond: A Millennium Heritage. John Benjamins. pp. 606–624.
- Parkes, Ruth (2011). "The Deidamia Achilli: An Eleventh Century Statian-Ovidian Epistle". International Journal of the Classical Tradition. 18 (1): 19–35. doi:10.1007/sl2138-011-0232-9. JSTOR 41474685.
- Stohlmann, Jürgen (1973). "'Deidamia Achilli': Ein Ovid-Imitation aus dem 11. Jahrhundert". In Alf Önnerfors; Johannes Rathofer; Fritz Wagner (eds.). Literatur und Sprache im europäischen Mittelalter: Festschrift für Karl Langosch zum 79. Geburtstag. Wissenschaftliche Buchgesellschaft. pp. 195–231.
