= Philibert Vigier =

French sculptor (1636–1719)

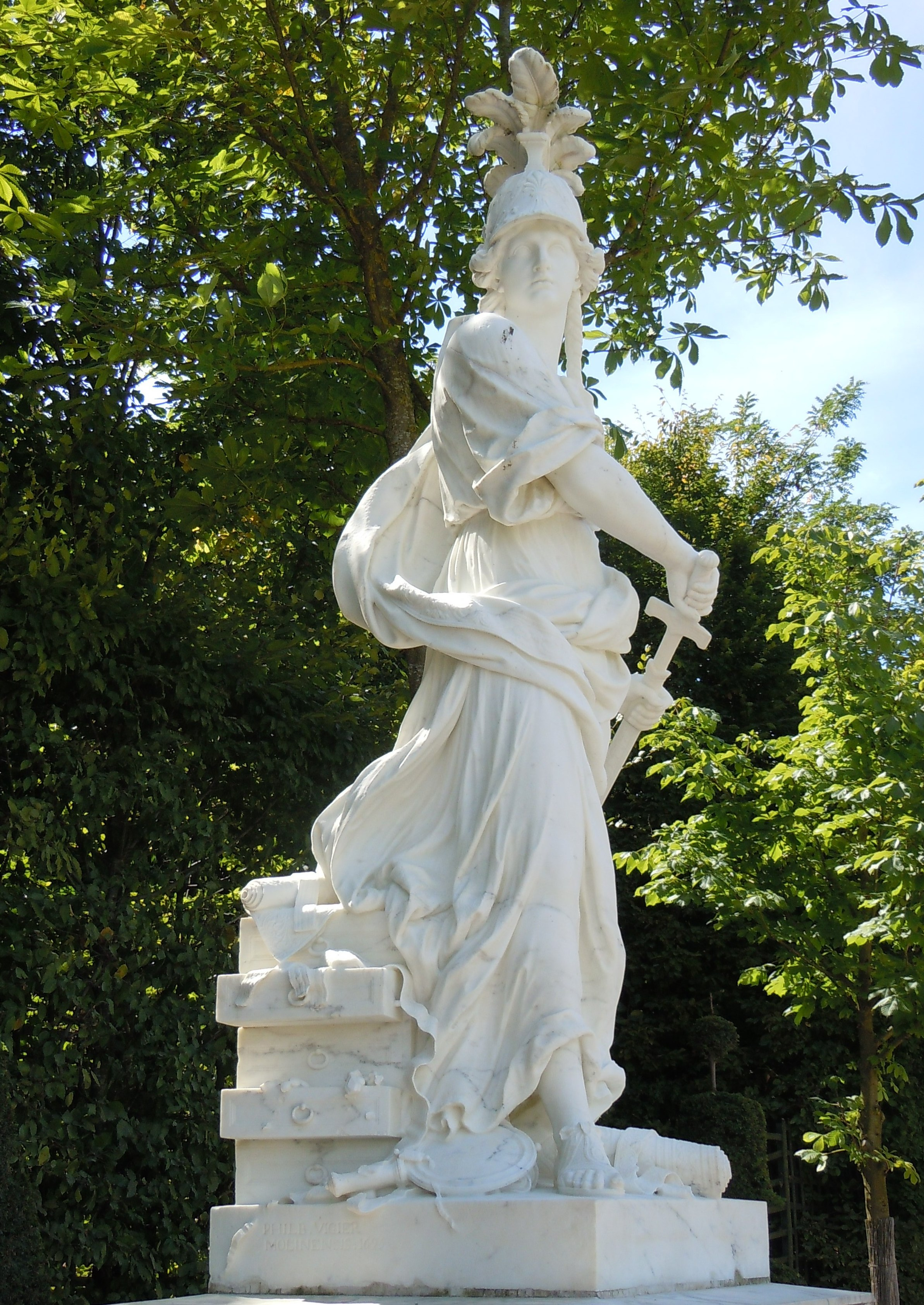
Achilles in Scyros, 1695, Versailles Gardens

Philibert Vigier (21 January 1636 – 5 January 1719) was a French sculptor.

He was born in Moulins, Bourbonnais in 1636. His brother Étienne Vigier also was a sculptor. The best-known works by Philibert Vigier were made for the gardens of the Palace of Versailles. He became a member of the Académie royale de peinture et de sculpture in 1683. He died in 1719.

== Works ==
His most famous work is the statue of Achilles on Skyros in the Versailles Gardens, which he finished in 1695. Other works in the Gardens include a copy of the Laocoon group, and a gigantic Medici vase. For the castle chapel he created a couple of angels in relief.

He also created a bas-relief medaillon of Saint Thomas for the parish church Notre Dame in Versailles in 1683, one of a series of twelve such sculptures by different sculptors made when they entered the Royal Academy.
