= Jean-Charles-Julien Luce de Lancival =

French poet and playwright

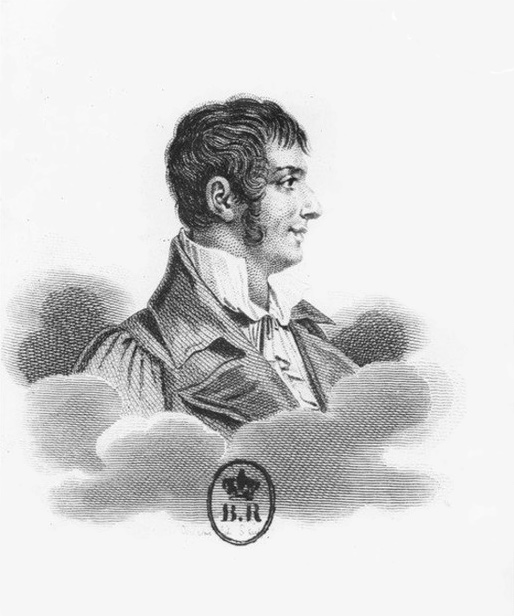
- French poet and playwright, (1764–1810)
- Born: 28 April 1764; Saint-Gobain, Picardie, France
- Died: 17 August 1810 (aged 46); Paris, France
- Occupations: Poet; Playwright

Jean-Charles-Julien Luce de Lancival (28 April 1764 – 17 August 1810). was an 18th–19th-century French poet and playwright.

== Biography ==
Luce Lancival made brilliant studies at the Louis-le-Grand college and was appointed professor of rhetoric at the college of Navarre aged just 22 years (1786). The following year, under the influence of a disappointment in love, he left teaching and took orders. He was noted for his preaching talents. At the French Revolution, he broke his vows and turned to theater.

Around 1797, he was in charge of French literature at the French Prytanée, former Louis-le-Grand college. He remained professor of rhetoric at the Imperial High School at the time of the reorganization of the University. He was then called to the Latin poetry chair at the Sorbonne.

In 1805, he gave his poem in six songs Achille à Scyros, his best known work. Imitated from the Achilleid by Statius, it is a book written with care, which includes interesting and ingenious features descriptions, even if the whole lacks of movement and relieves some boredom.

In theater, Luce Lancival won his greatest success shortly before his death, with his tragedy Hector, shown in 1809 at the Comédie française. On a topic drawn from the Iliad, the play caused a sensation with a character judged by the very contemporary faithful to the spirit of ancient Greece. Napoleon rewarded the author by giving him a pension of 6,000 French francs.

His love of life, pushed to debauchery, was famous in his time. He was to lose a leg in an accident and used a wooden substitute. Despite this weakness and failing health, he committed himself with great dedication to the teaching of literature and was an outstanding educator. Stendhal wrote "Luce Lancival had a wooden leg and kindness". His early death was caused by syphilis.

== Works ==
- 1784: De Pace, Latin poem
- 1784: Poème sur le globe
- 1794: Hormisdas, three-act tragedy, non presented
- 1794: Mucius Scaevola, three-act tragedy
- unpublished Archibal, three-act tragedy, unpublished
- 1797: Fernandez, three-act tragedy
- 1798: Périandre, five-act tragedy
- 1802: Ode sur le rob anti-syphilitique du citoyen B. Laffecteur
- 1805: Achille à Scyros, poem in six songs
- 1809: Hector, five-act tragedy given at the Comédie-Française 2 February
- 1812: Folliculus, satire in four chants against the critic Julien Louis Geoffroy
- Le Lord impromptu, four-act comedy in verse, from a novel by Jacques Cazotte
