= Giuseppe Arena =

Italian composer and organist

Giuseppe Arena (1707 or 1713 -1784) was an Italian composer and organist, best known for his operas.

Giuseppe Arena was born in Malta in 1707 or 1713. From 1725 on he studied at the Poveri di Gesù music conservatory, where his teachers included Gaetano Greco and his successor Francesco Durante. Giovanni Battista Pergolesi started studying at the same conservatory in 1725 as well.

He may have worked for the prince of Bisignano, and is also said to have been the organist at the San Filippo Neri church in Naples.

In 1738, his first opera, Achille in Sciro, premiered in Rome, as did Il vello d'oro in 1740 and Farnace in 1742. Other works premiered in Turin, including La clemenza di Tito in December 1738 and Artaserse in 1741. That same year saw the premiere of Titus in Venice, while Naples was the first place were, in 1746, Il vecchio deluso was performed. Later in his career he mostly composed works for smaller groups. He also wrote a treatise, Principij di musica con intavolature di cembalo e partimenti.
