= Athenion of Maroneia =

3rd-century BC Greek painter

Athenion of Maroneia (Ancient Greek: Ἀθηνίων Μαρωνίτης) was an ancient Greek painter, born at Maroneia in Thrace who flourished during the late 4th and early 3rd centuries BC. He was a pupil of Glaucion of Corinth, and a contemporary probably of Nicias, whom he resembled and excelled, though his style was harsher. He gave promise of the highest excellence in his art, but died young.

== Works ==
- Αχιλλεύς ως κόρη (Achilles, disguised as a Girl, discovered by Odysseus)
- Συγγενικόν (An Assembly of Relatives)
- Νεανίας Iπποκόμος (Α Groom with a Horse)
- Φύλαρχος (Phylarch)
