= Domenico Sarro =

Italian composer (1679–1744)

Domenico Natale Sarro, also Sarri (24 December 1679 – 25 January 1744) was an Italian composer.

Born in Trani, Apulia, Kingdom of Naples, he studied at the Neapolitan conservatory of S. Onofrio. He composed extensively in the early 18th century. His opera Didone abbandonata, premiered on 1 February 1724 at the Teatro San Bartolomeo in Naples, was the first setting of a major libretto by Pietro Metastasio. He is best remembered today as the composer of Achille in Sciro, the opera that was chosen to open the new Teatro di San Carlo in 1737.

Of his many intermezzi, 'Dorina e Nibbio' or L'impresario delle Isole Canarie (1724) has had an extensive performance history. With a libretto by Pietro Metastasio (his only comic libretto), it was performed often and imitated internationally (with versions by Albinoni, Gasparini, Leo, Martini and others). In recent years it was performed in the State Theatre of Stuttgart, the Bochum Symphony as well as the Semperoper Dresden.

In addition to his Operas and other large scale works, Sarro has written a considerable number of vocal cantatas which show great charm and inventiveness. 'Coronatemi il crin' for Alto, two violins and continuo, is perhaps his most well known cantata.

The only known depiction of Domenico Sarro is Nicolò Maria Rossi's painting of the Viceroy at the festa of the Quattro Altari in the Harrach collection. Sarro is one of the many composers depicted as part of the Neapolitan Court (La festa dei Quattro Altari, 1745).

== Operas ==
Year	Title	Libretto	First performance	Partitura (stato e luogo di conservazione)	Note
1706	Il fonte delle grazie, oratorio		20 novembre 1706, Congregazione dei dottori della Chiesa dei Gerolamini di Napoli		
1707	Il Vespesiano, Dramma per musica in 3 atti	Carlo De Petris	1707, Teatro San Bartolomeo di Napoli		
1708	Serenata a 3 voci (Amore, Eco e Narciso)		8 settembre 1708, Palazzo del duca d'Alvito di Napoli		
1713	I gemelli rivali	Nicolò Serino	11 febbraio 1713, Teatro dei Fiorentini di Napoli		
1713	Il comando non inteso ed ubbidito	Nicola Giuvo	15 maggio 1713, Teatro dei Fiorentini di Napoli		
1716	Serenata nuziale a 3 voci	G.G.Alberghetti	21 gennaio 1716, Palazzo del Principe di Montaguto di Napoli		
1718	Armida al campo, Dramma per musica in 3 atti	Francesco Silvani	13 febbraio 1718, Teatro San Bartolomeo di Napoli		
1718	La fede ne' tradimenti (o Anagilda), Dramma per musica in 3 atti	Girolamo Gigli	15 maggio 1718, Teatro San Bartolomeo di Napoli		
1718	L'Eudamia	?			
1718	Arsace, Dramma per musica in 3 atti	Antonio Salvi	17 dicembre 1718, Teatro San Bartolomeo di Napoli		
1719	Alessandro Severo, Dramma per musica in 3 atti	Apostolo Zeno	14 maggio 1719, Teatro San Bartolomeo di Napoli		
1720	Ginevra principessa di Scozia, Dramma per musica in 3 atti	Apostolo Zeno	20 gennaio 1720, Teatro San Bartolomeo di Napoli		
1720	Scherzo festivo fra le ninfe di Partenope, Serenata	Domenico Gentile	28 agosto 1720, Teatro del Palazzo Reale di Napoli		
1721	Serenata nuziale a 6 voci, Serenata		28 gennaio 1721, Palazzo del Principe della Rocca di Napoli		
1721	Endimione, azione teatrale a 4 voci, in 2 parti	Pietro Metastasio	30 maggio 1721, Palazzo del principe di Belmonte della Rocca di Napoli		
1722	La Partenope, Dramma per musica in 3 atti	Silvio Stampiglia	16 dicembre 1722, Teatro San Bartolomeo di Napoli with intermezzo Eurilla e Beltramme		
1723	La caduta de decemviri, Dramma per musica in 3 atti (pasticcio)	Silvio Stampiglia	26 dicembre 1723, Regio Teatro Ducale di Milano		
1724	Didone abbandonata, Dramma per musica in 3 atti (1^ Versione)	Pietro Metastasio	1º febbraio 1724, Teatro San Bartolomeo di Napoli		
1724	L'impresario delle Canarie (o Dorina e Nibbio), Intermezzo in 2 parti	Pietro Metastasio	1º febbraio 1724, Teatro San Bartolomeo di Napoli		
1726	Il Valdemaro	Apostolo Zeno			
1727	Siroe, re di Persia, Dramma per musica in 3 atti	Pietro Metastasio	25 gennaio 1927, Teatro San Bartolomeo di Napoli		
1727	Moschetta, Intermezzo		25 gennaio 1727, Teatro San Bartolomeo di Napoli		
1727	Grullo, Intermezzo		25 gennaio 1727, Teatro San Bartolomeo di Napoli		
1731	Artemisia, Dramma per musica in 3 atti	Giovanni Ambrogio Migliavacca	7 gennaio 1731, Teatro San Bartolomeo di Napoli		
1731	La furba e lo sciocco, Intermezzo		7 gennaio 1731, Teatro San Bartolomeo di Napoli		
1732	Berenice		13 gennaio 1732, Teatro di Torre Argentina di Roma		
1735	Demofoonte, Dramma per musica in 3 atti (Pasticcio)	Pietro Metastasio	20 gennaio 1735, Teatro San Bartolomeo di Napoli		
1735	Gli amanti generosi, opera comica	Tommaso Mariani	15 maggio 1735, Teatro dei Fiorentini di Napoli		
1737	La passione di Gesù Christo Signor Nostro, oratorio sacro in 2 parti	Pietro Metastasio	14 aprile 1737, Oratorio San Filippo Neri di Genova		
1737	Achille in Sciro, Dramma per musica in 3 atti	Pietro Metastasio	4 novembre 1737, Inaugurazione del Nuovo Grande Real Teatro San Carlo di Napoli		
1738	Le nozze di Teti e Peleo, Intermezzo	Nicola Giuvo	2 dicembre 1738, Real Teatro San Carlo di Napoli with Vittoria Tesi and Francesco Bernardi		
1741	Ezio, Dramma per musica in 3 atti	Pietro Metastasio	4 novembre 1741, Real Teatro San Carlo di Napoli		
1743	Alessandro nelle Indie, Dramma per musica in 3 atti	Pietro Metastasio	Carnevale 1743, Real Teatro San Carlo di Napoli		
