= Lycomedes of Scyros =

Greek mythical figure, killer of Theseus

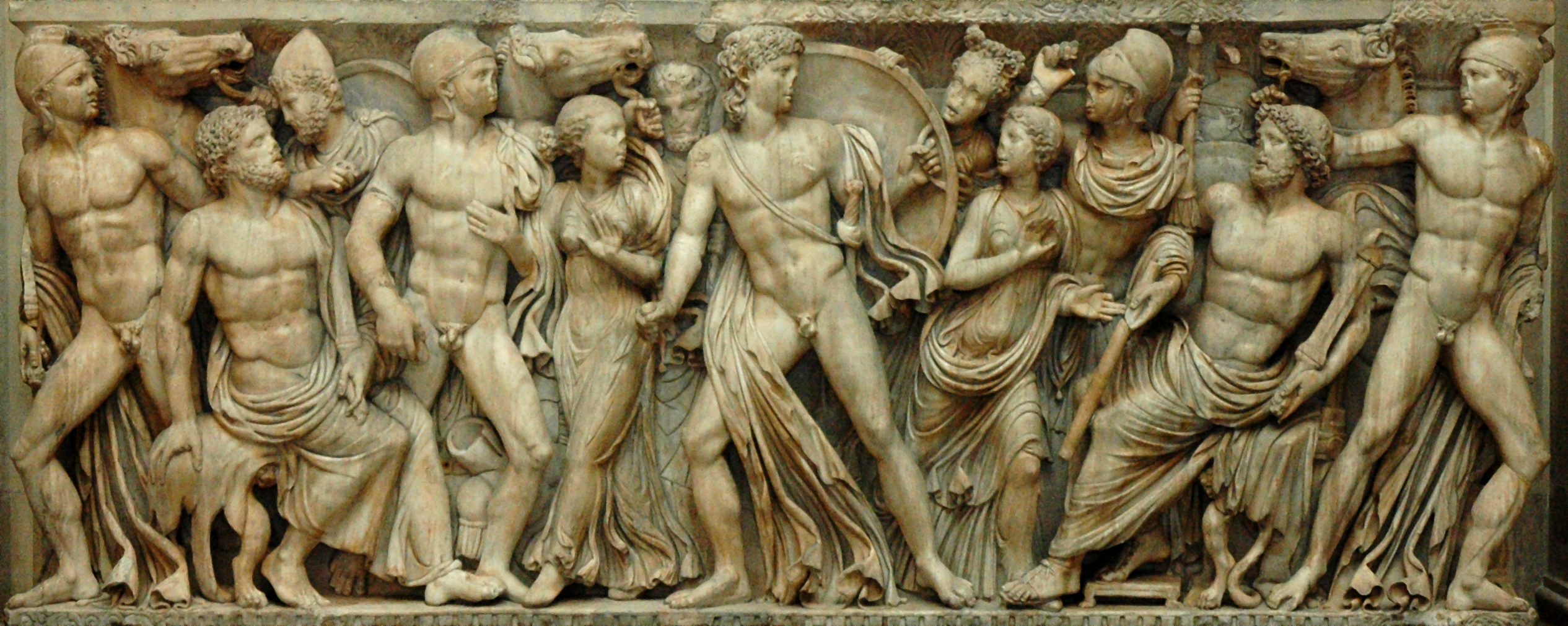
Depiction of Achilles on Skyros on a panel of an Attic sarcophagus, c. 240 AD. Achilles stands in the middle (without his female disguise), while Lycomedes is the seated figure on the left, and Agamemnon sits on the right.

In Greek mythology, Lycomedes /ˌlaɪkəˈmiːdiːz/ (Ancient Greek: Λυκομήδης), also known as Lycurgus, was the most prominent king of the Dolopians in the island of Scyros near Euboea during the Trojan War.

== Family ==
Lycomedes was the father of seven daughters including Deidameia, and grandfather of Pyrrhus or Neoptolemus.

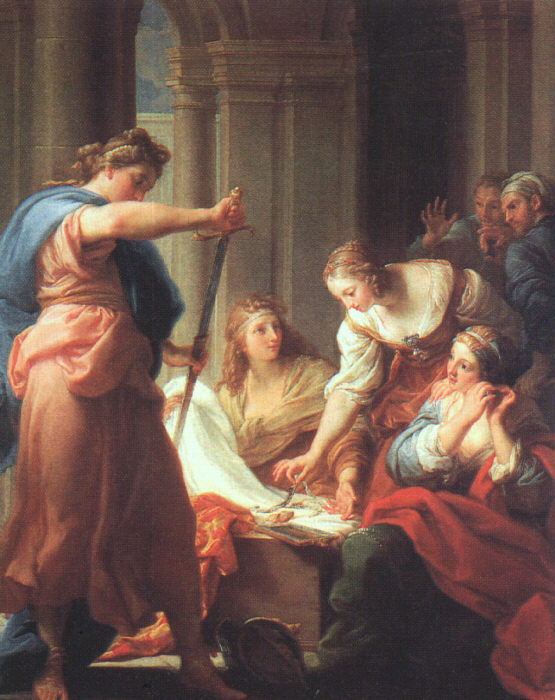
"Achilles at the Court of Lycomedes" by Pompeo Batoni, 1745, oil on canvas, Uffizi, Florence

== Mythology ==
=== Death of Theseus ===
Plutarch says that Lycomedes killed Theseus, who had fled to his island in exile by pushing him off a cliff for he feared that Theseus would dethrone him, as people of the island treated the guest with marked honor. Some related that the cause of this violence was that Lycomedes would not give up the estates which Theseus had in Scyros, or the circumstance that Lycomedes wanted to gain the favour of Menestheus.

=== Achilles ===
At the request of Thetis, Lycomedes concealed Achilles in female disguise among his own daughters. At Lycomedes' court, Achilles had an affair with Deidamia, which resulted in the birth of Neoptolemus (Pyrrhus). As Odysseus drew Achilles out of his disguise and took him to Troy, Neoptolemus stayed with his grandfather until he too was summoned during the later stages of the war.

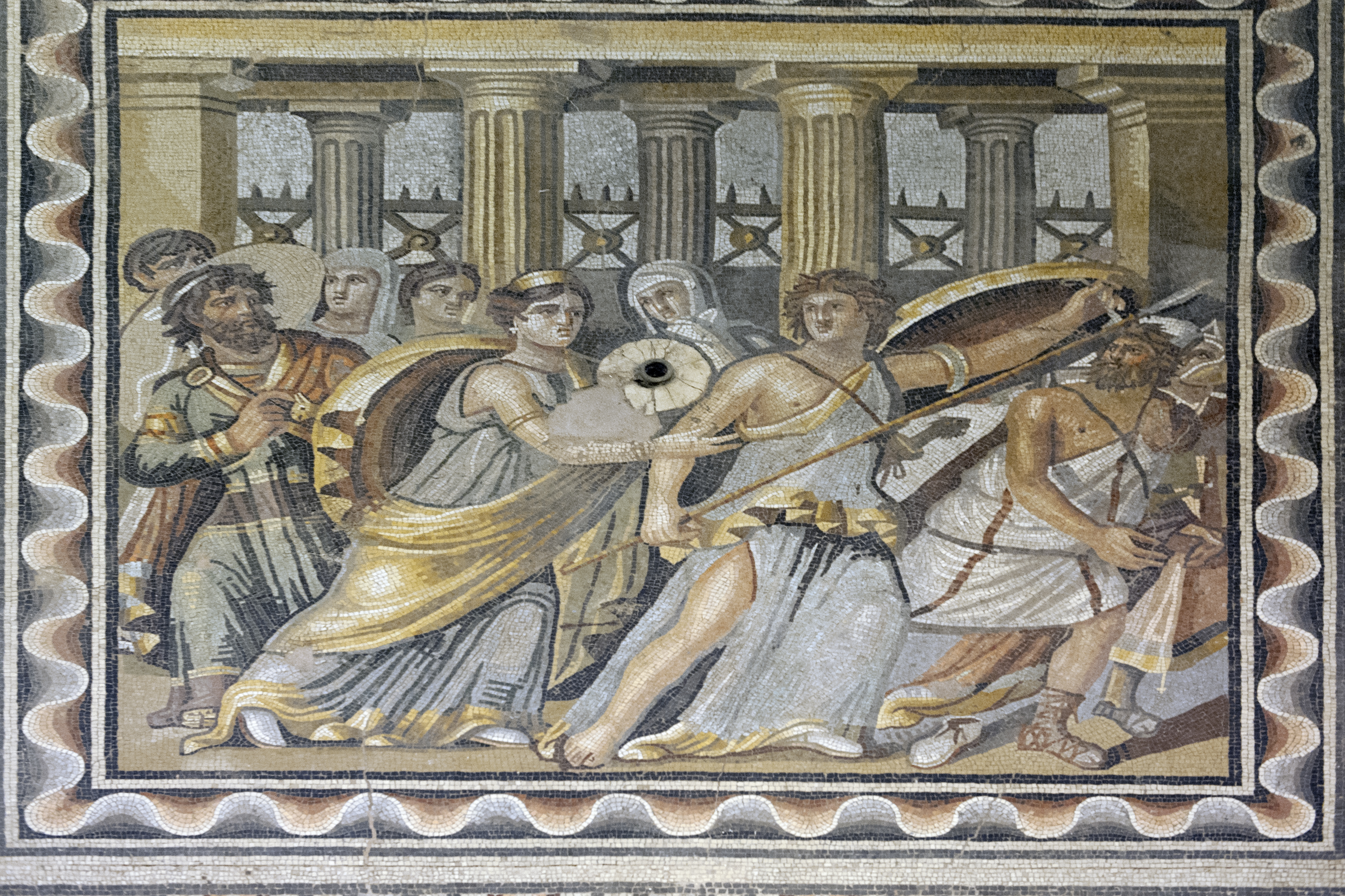
A Roman mosaic from the Poseidon Villa in Zeugma, Commagene (now in the Zeugma Mosaic Museum) depicting Achilles on Skyros disguised as a woman and Odysseus tricking him into revealing himself

== Namesake ==
The asteroid 9694 Lycomedes is named for him – being a Jupiter Trojan, a group of asteroids which are by convention named for characters associated with the Trojan War.
