= Deidamia (daughter of Lycomedes) =

Greek mythological figure

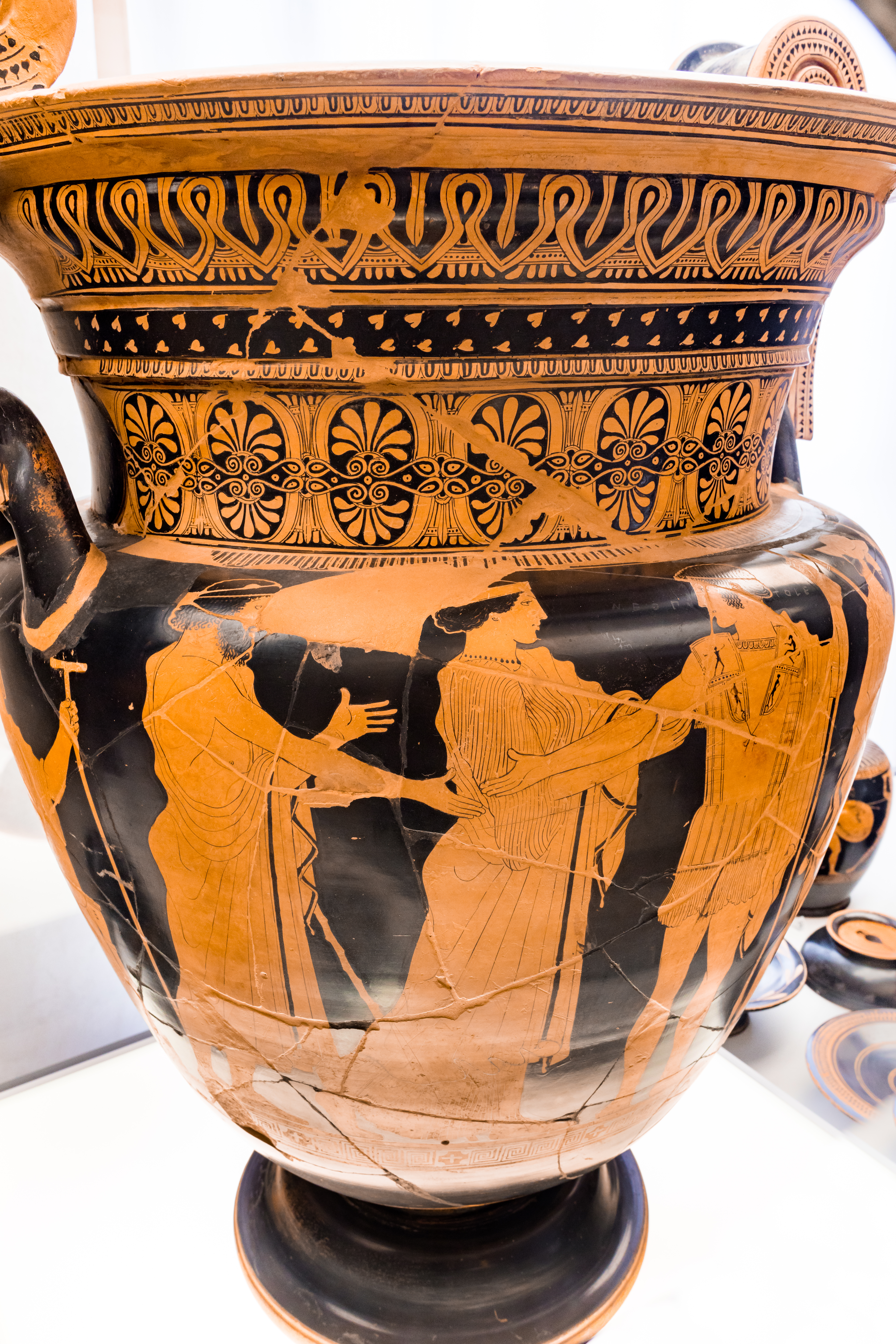
Deidamia farewells Neoptolemus as he departs, 460-455 BC Attic red-figure volute krater, National Archaeological Museum of Ferrara.

In Greek mythology, Deidamia (/ˌdeɪdəˈmaɪə/; Ancient Greek: Δηιδάμεια, romanized: Dēidámeia) is a daughter of King Lycomedes, who lives on the island of Scyros. She marries Achilles, by whom she becomes the mother of Neoptolemus. Following the Trojan War, her son gives her in marriage to Helenus, a Trojan captive. She is sometimes said to have a second son, Oneiros, or to have only been Neoptolemus's nurturer (rather than his mother).

== Mythology ==
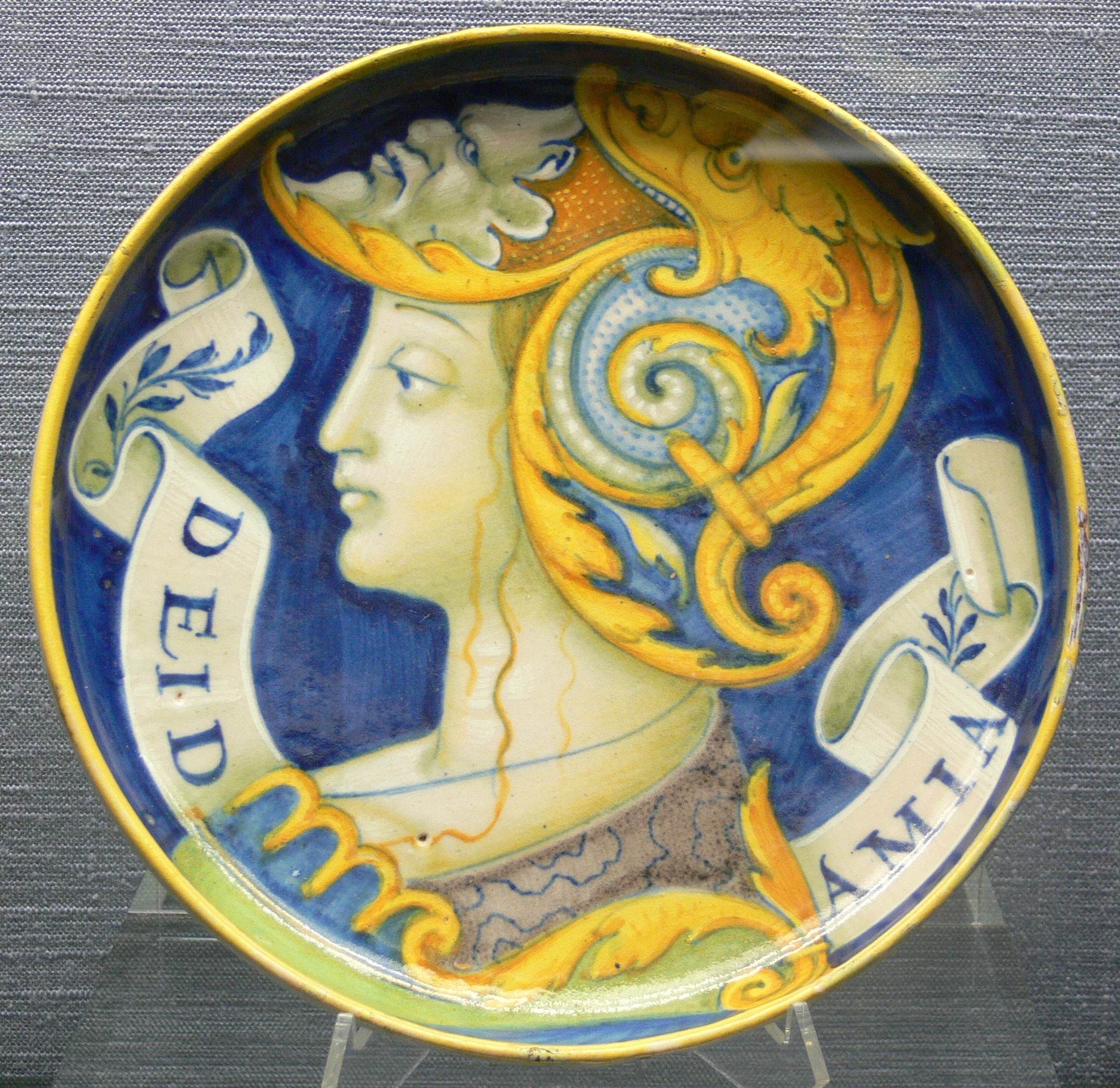
Representation of Deidamia on a 16th-century bowl

Deidamia was one of King Lycomedes' seven daughters with whom Achilles was concealed. Some versions of this story state that Achilles was hidden in Lycomedes' court as one of the king's daughters, some say as a lady-in-waiting under the name "Pyrrha". The two soon became romantically involved to the point of intimacy. After Odysseus arrived at Lycomedes's palace and exposed Achilles as a young man, the hero decided to join the Trojan War, along with his therápon Patroclus, leaving behind his wife Deidamia.

Years later, Deidamia tried to persuade their son, Neoptolemus, not to join his father in the same war. After the death of Achilles, Neoptolemus went to Troy to support the Achaeans. After the war, Deidamia was given in marriage by Neoptolemus to his slave Helenus, the son of Priam whom he had brought to Epirus. Later on, Neoptolemus was eventually killed by Orestes when the son of Agamemnon went mad.

In a different version of Neoptolemus's childhood, Iphigenia rather than Deidamia is his mother, though the latter does raise him. According to the Alexandrine grammarian Ptolemy Hephaestion, Achilles and Deidamia had another son, Oneiros. This son was killed by Orestes (who was unable to recognize him) in Phocis while the two were fighting over a place to pitch a tent.

== Literature ==
The tragedians Euripides and Sophocles, both of whom date to the 5th century BC, each composed a work titled Skyroi, in which Deidamia was an important figure. In a poem in the Greek Anthology, she was instead referred to as Pyrrha.

An anonymous Latin author of the 11th century created a verse epistle, Deidamia Achilli, in the style of Ovid's Heroides, in which Deidamia complains to Achilles about her abandonment.
