= Achille in Sciro =

Libretto by Pietro Metastasio

Achille in Sciro is an opera and libretto by Pietro Metastasio telling the story of Achilles on Skyros. It was first set to music by Antonio Caldara in 1736, and premiered at the wedding of Maria Theresa and Francis of Lorraine in Vienna. In 1772, Johann Anton Koch translated the libretto to German under the name "Achilles in Scyro".

== Theme ==
The libretto is centered around the Greek mythological hero Achilles. For his libretto, Metastasio drew from various works as inspiration for its themes. The plot has also similarities with the 1664 libretto L'Achille in Sciro by Ippolito Bentivoglio, which was set to music in 1663 by Giovanni Legrenzi. The work is subtitled "dramma immaginato".

== Selected settings ==
- Achille in Sciro (Sarro), 1737, modern revival conducted by Sardelli recorded by Dynamic
- Achille in Sciro, Francesco Corselli 1744
- Niccolò Jommelli 1749
