= 15th century BC =

One hundred years, from 1500 BC to 1401 BC

The 15th century BC was the century that lasted from 1500 BC to 1401 BC.

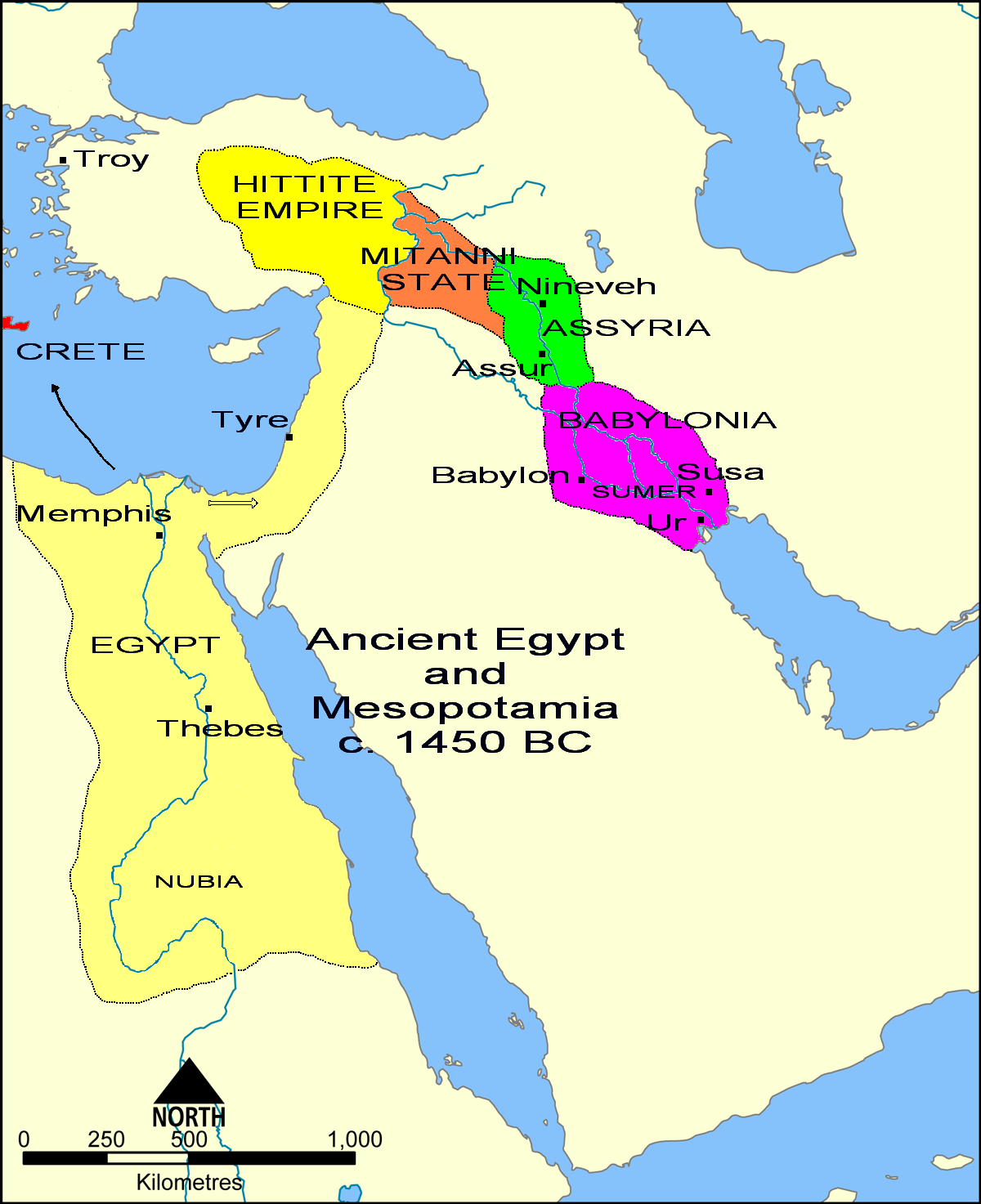
Map of the Near East in 1450 BCE.

== Events ==
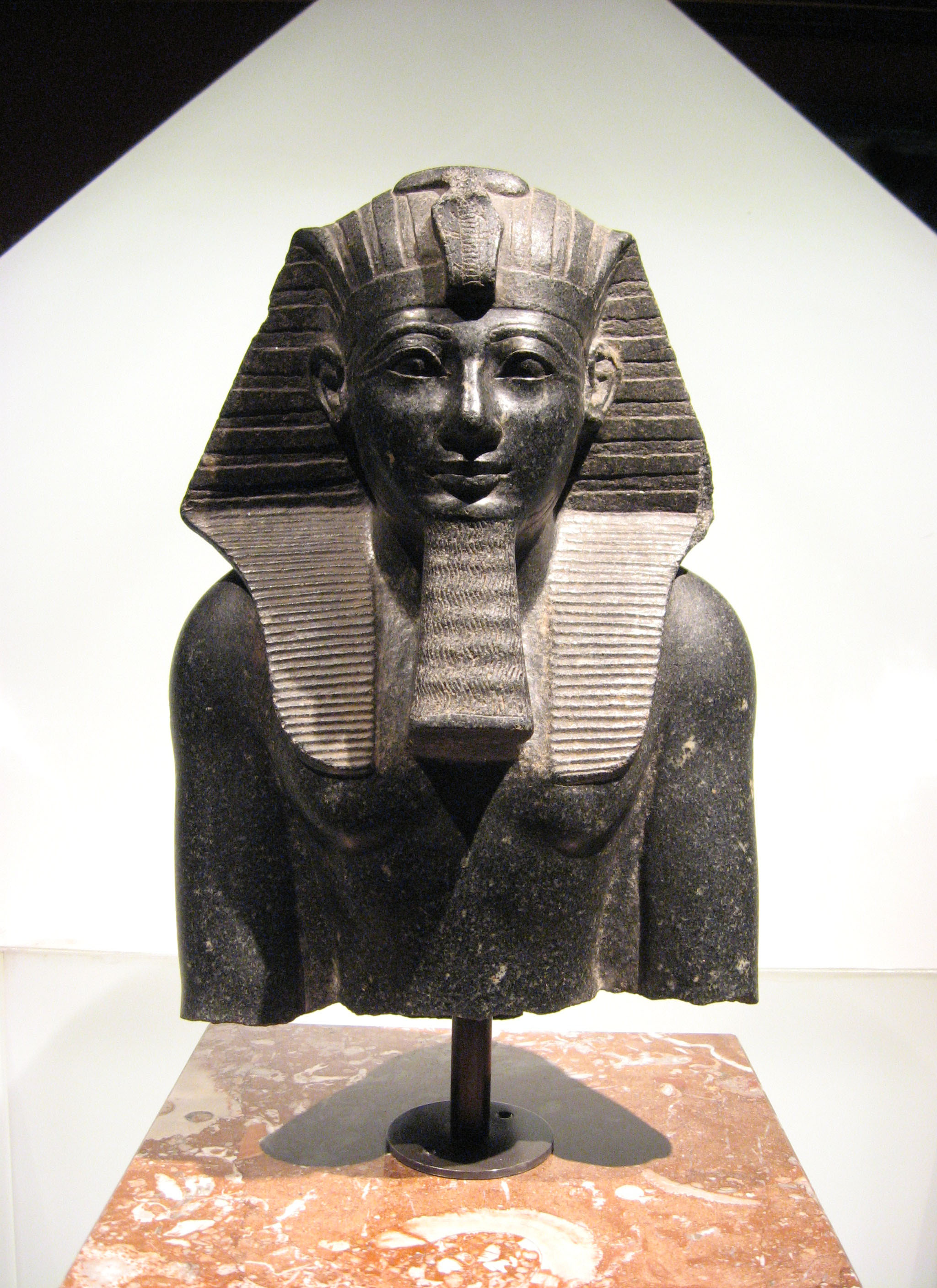
Statue of Thutmosis III at the Kunsthistorisches Museum, Vienna

- 1504 BC – 1492 BC: Egypt conquers Nubia and the Levant.
- 1500 BC – 1400 BC: The Battle of the Ten Kings took place around this time.
- 1500 BC: Coalescence of a number of cultural traits including undecorated pottery, megalithic burials, and millet-bean-rice agriculture indicate the beginning of the Mumun Pottery Period on the Korean Peninsula.
- c. 1490 BC: Cranaus, legendary King of Athens, is deposed after a reign of 10 years by his son-in-law Amphictyon of Thessaly, son of Deucalion and Pyrrha.
- 1487 BC: Amphictyon, son of Deucalion and Pyrrha and legendary King of Athens, dies after a reign of 10 years and is succeeded by Erichthonius I of Athens, a grandson of Cranaus.
- c. 1480 BC: Queen Hatshepsut succeeded by her stepson and nephew Thutmose III. Period of greatest Egyptian expansion (4th Nile cataract to the Euphrates).
- c. 1469 BC: In the Battle of Megiddo, Egypt defeats Canaan (Low Chronology).
- c. 1460 BC: The Kassites overrun Babylonia and found a dynasty there that lasts for 576 years and nine months.
- 1437 BC: Legendary King Erichthonius I of Athens dies after a reign of 50 years and is succeeded by his son Pandion I.
- 1430 BC – 1178 BC: Beginning of Hittite empire.
- c. 1420 BC: Crete conquered by Mycenae—start of the Mycenaean period. First Linear B tablets.
- 1400 BC: In Crete the use of bronze helmets (discovery at Knossos).
- 1400 BC: Palace of Minos destroyed by fire.
- c. 1400 BC: Linear A reaches its peak of popularity.
- c. 1400 BC: The height of the Canaanite town of Ugarit. Royal Palace of Ugarit is built.
- Myceneans conquers Greece and border of Anatolia.
- The Tumulus culture flourishes.
- Earliest traces of Olmec civilization.

== Inventions, discoveries, introductions ==
- The Shang dynasty Chinese capital city at Ao had massive defensive walls of 20 metres (66 ft) in width at the base and enclosed an area of some 2,100 square yards (1,800 m^{2}).

== Sovereign states ==
See: List of sovereign states in the 15th century BC.
