= 1460s BC =

The 1460s BC was a decade lasting from January 1, 1469 BC to December 31, 1460 BC.

== Events and trends ==
- c. 1469 BC—In the Battle of Megiddo, Egypt defeats Canaan. It is the first battle recorded in history.
- c.1468 BC - Thutmose III encounters the Mitanni in his conquest.

== Significant people ==
- Hatshepsut of Egypt, female Pharaoh of the 18th Dynasty (1473 BC–1458 BC)
