= Mopsopus =

Eponymous king of Mopsopia

In Greek mythology, Mopsopus or Mopsopos (Ancient Greek: Μόψοπος, romanized: Mópsopos) was the eponymous king of Mopsopia, later known as Attica after Atthis, daughter of King Cranaus of Athens. In another version of the myth, the region of Mopsopia was named in her honor of Mopsopia, one of the 3,000 Oceanids, water-nymph daughters of the Titan Oceanus.
