= Crenaia, the Nymph of the Dargle =

Painting by Frederic Leighton

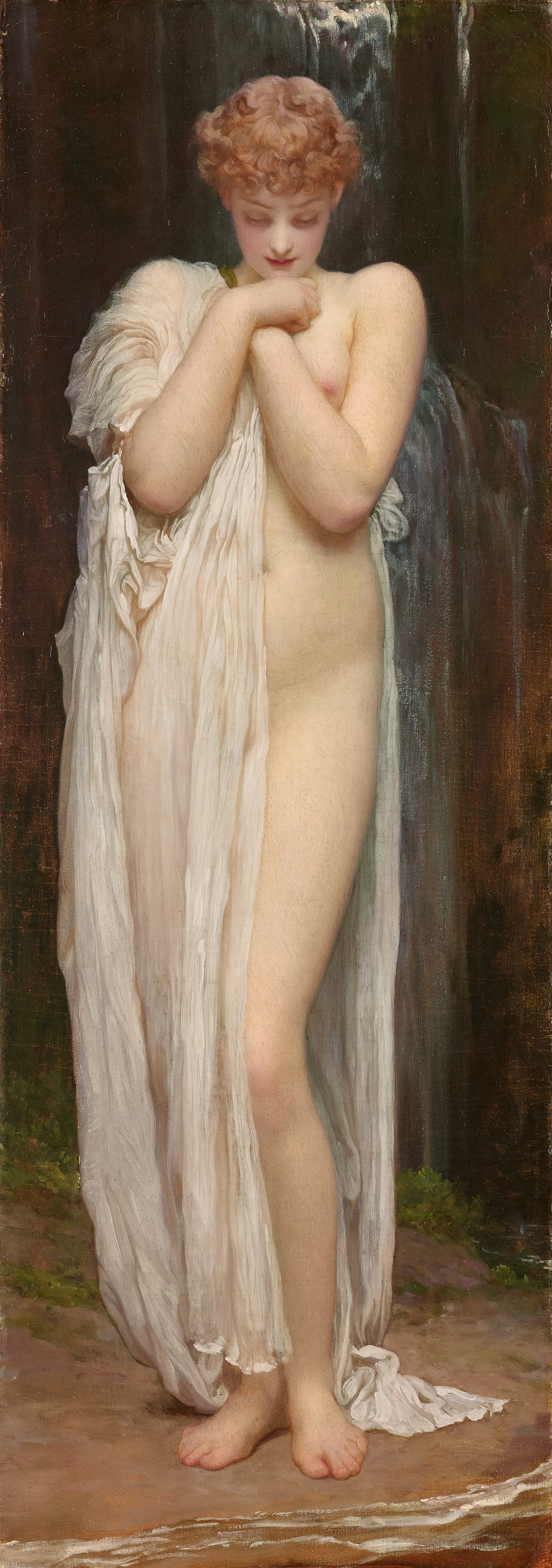
- Artist: Frederic Leighton
- Year: 1880
- Medium: Oil on canvas
- Dimensions: 75 cm × 25 cm (29.5 in × 10 in)
- Owner: Juan Antonio Pérez Simón

Crenaia, the Nymph of the Dargle is an oil painting by Frederic Leighton, first exhibited in 1880. It is in the collection of Juan Antonio Pérez Simón.

== History ==
Leighton had visited Ireland to paint landscape in the summer of 1874, and possibly on other occasions in the 1870s. The first owner of the picture was Lord Powerscourt, whose Irish seat, the Powerscourt Estate, was near to the landscape that inspired Crenaia. The little River Dargle flows through the estate and forms many waterfalls.

The picture, now also known as The Nymph of the Dargle, was exhibited at the Royal Academy of Arts in 1880 under the title of Crenaia. Frederic George Stephens, writing for The Athenæum, was enthusiastic about the painting when it was shown:

The next picture is a small one, named Crenaia (655), and comprises a single figure of a nymph standing in a cavern or rocky niche by the side of a spring of clear water, and huddling to her chin an abundance of diaphanous white drapery, which, falling in front, conceals half the bearer's form, and leaves half uncovered. This is a pretty action, and has been expressed with taste and much spontaneity. The carnations lack a little of that inner golden tint which, when omitted, leaves the purer red and white too rosy and too pale. The drapery is beautiful in design and painting.

== Context ==
In Greek mythology, Cranaë, or Crenaia (Ancient Greek: Κρανάη, lit. 'stony'), was, together with her sisters Atthis and Cranaechme, one of the three goddesses of rocks, headlands and cliffs.

== Description ==
The painting represents a small full-length figure facing the spectator; the River Dargle flows through Powerscourt, and forms the waterfall here represented in the background, hence its name. The figure is remarkable for its Irish traits. Edgcumbe Staley calls it "the least eclectic of all Leightons girl-beauties". Her carnations are pale; her arms are modestly crossed over her bosom. She is nearly nude: what draperies she has are creamy.

== Sources ==
- Jones, Stephen, et al. (1996). Frederic Leighton, 1830–1896. Royal Academy of Arts, London: Harry N. Abrams, Inc. p. 192.
- Rhys, Ernest (1900). Frederic Lord Leighton: An Illustrated Record of his Life and Work. London: George Bell & Sons. pp. 42, 127.
- Staley, Edgcumbe (1906). Lord Leighton of Stretton. London: The Walter Scott Publishing Co., Ltd.; New York: Charles Scribner's Sons. pp. 116–118.
- Stephens, Frederic George (1 May 1880). "The Royal Academy. (First Notice.)". The Athenæum, N^{o} 2740. p. 572.
