= Mopsopia =

Water-nymph daughter of the Titan Oceanus

In Greek mythology, Mopsopia (Ancient Greek: Μοψοπία, romanized: Mopsopía) was one of the 3,000 Oceanids, water-nymph daughters of the Titan Oceanus. The region of Attica was named Mopsopia in her honor before being renamed after Atthis, daughter of King Cranaus of Athens. In another version of the myth, a certain Mopsopus was the eponymous ruler of Mopsopia.
