= Atthis =

Atthis can be:

- Atthis (mythology), in Greek myth, the daughter of Cranaus
- Atthis (plural: Atthides), the traditional title for ancient historical works on Athenian history, written by an atthidographer
- A woman mentioned in love poetry by Sappho
- Atthis (bird) in a genus in the hummingbird family
- Atthis (Obernewtyn character) in the Obernewtyn Chronicles, by Isobelle Carmody
- 8975 Atthis, an asteroid
