= Chryseis =

Mythological Greek character

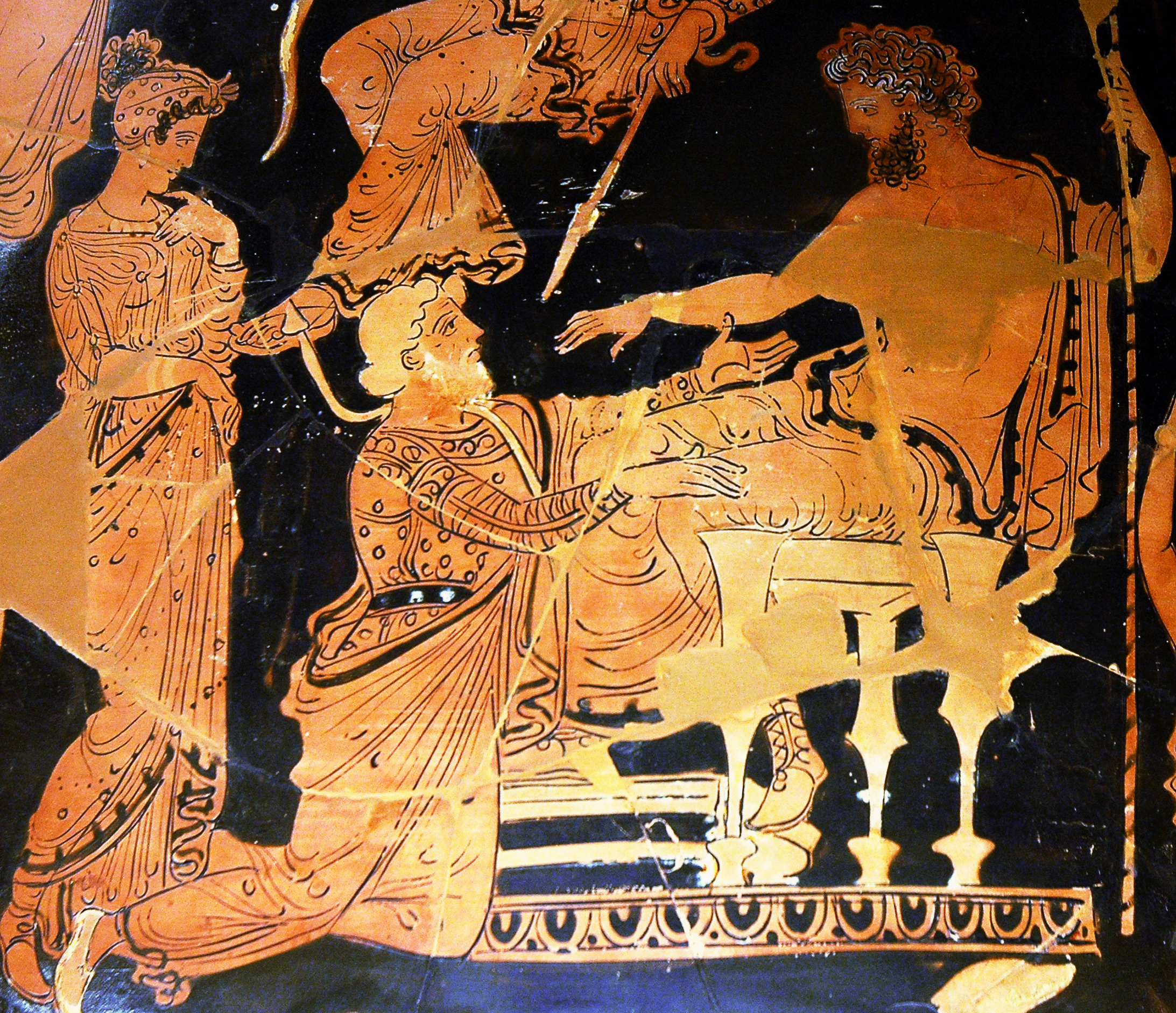
Chryses tries to ransom Chryseis from Agamemnon on an Apulian red-figure volute-crater, c. 360 BC–350 BCE by the Athens Painter.

Chryseis (/kraɪˈsiːɪs/, Ancient Greek: Χρυσηίς, romanized: Khrusēís, pronounced [kʰryːsɛːís]) is a Trojan woman in Homer's Iliad, the daughter of Chryses. Chryseis, her apparent name in the Iliad, means simply "Chryses' daughter"; later writers give her real name as Astynome (Ἀστυνόμη). The 12th-century poet Tzetzes describes her as "very young and thin, with milky skin; had blond hair and small breasts; nineteen years old and still a virgin".

As the "golden one" she is also the title-giving character of the Baroque alchemical epic Chryseidos Libri IIII (1631).

== Mythology ==
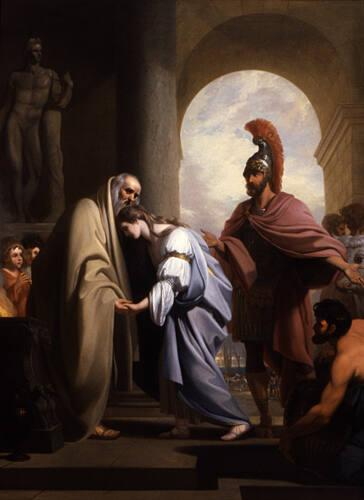
Chryseis returned to her father (1771) by Benjamin West

Chryseis was sent by her father for protection, or, according to others, to attend the celebration of a festival of Artemis in Hypoplacian Thebe or in Lyrnessus where she was taken as prisoner by the Achaeans. According to some, she was the wife of Eetion, king of Lyrnessus (usually described as the ruler of nearby Cilician Thebe), who was killed by the son of Peleus during his campaigns against the allies of Troy. However, the Byzantine poet John Tzetzes suggests that it was Palamedes that abducted Chryseis as well as Briseis.

In the first book of the Iliad, during the distribution of the booty from the sack of Thebe, Chryseis was given to Agamemnon as a sex slave by unanimous decision, in view of his kingly office. He bragged that he preferred her as a bed-mate to his wife Clytemnestra, because of her figure, her grace, and her skill at domestic tasks. Her father, the priest of Apollo, came to the Achaeans' beachhead bearing the god's sacred symbols and offered the Mycenaean king and his army gifts of gold and silver. Although the other warriors were eager to accept the ransom, Agamemnon rejected it. He treated the old man without the proper respect due to a priest, taunting him crassly with the image of the girl forever sharing his bed in distant Achaea, and sending him away rudely with threats of violence. Chryses, afraid, went apart and prayed on the beach for revenge. Apollo heard his prayer and, by means of his silver arrows, sent a plague sweeping through the Greek armies, so that Agamemnon was forced to give Chryseis back in order to save his men from the disease. He sent Odysseus to return the maiden to Chryses. Agamemnon compensated himself for this loss by taking Briseis from Achilles. The offended Achilles refused to take further part in the Trojan War.

After the attack on Rhesus and his Thracian armies, Chryses came to the Greeks to thank them for returning his daughter, Chryseis. Because of this kindness, and because he knew that his daughter had been properly treated, he brought her back for Agamemnon to have. A later Greek legend, preserved in Hyginus' Fabulae, states that she had a son named after her father by Agamemnon. In the city of Thebes in Asia Minor, Chryseis gave birth to Chryses and declared him to be a son of Apollo. This took place when she was released shortly as a prisoner and allowed to return to her hometown.

A few years later, when the children of Agamemnon, Orestes and Iphigenia, took refuge on the Island of Sminthos, now the home of Chryseis and her family, she proposed surrendering the fugitives to King Thoas. Her son Chryses, learning they were his half-siblings, helped them to kill the Taurian king.

In medieval literature, Chryseis is developed into the character Cressida.

== See also ==
- I Modi, a work of erotic art which depicts her
