= Phren =

Location of thought in ancient Greek philosophy

In Ancient Greek philosophy, Phren (Ancient Greek: φρήν, romanized: phrēn, lit. 'mind'; plural phrenes, φρένες) is the location of thought or contemplation. The kind of mental activity conducted in the Phren involves what 20th and 21 Century Western thinkers consider both feeling and thinking; scholars have remarked that Ancient Greeks located this activity in the torso as opposed to the head.

For example, phren is where Achilles considered his sadness about losing Briseis and his duty to join the Greeks against Troy. Phren, however, is not exclusively applied to humans. In Empedocles' system, Phren is a general psychological agent to which moral blame and praise can be extended, that darts through the universe as effluences, steers and controls the cosmos in the process and is the measure of what is harmonious and what is fit to exist. It is said that it is strongest at the region found beyond the universe where strife reigns.
