= Chryses (priest of Apollo) =

Trojan priest in Greek mythology

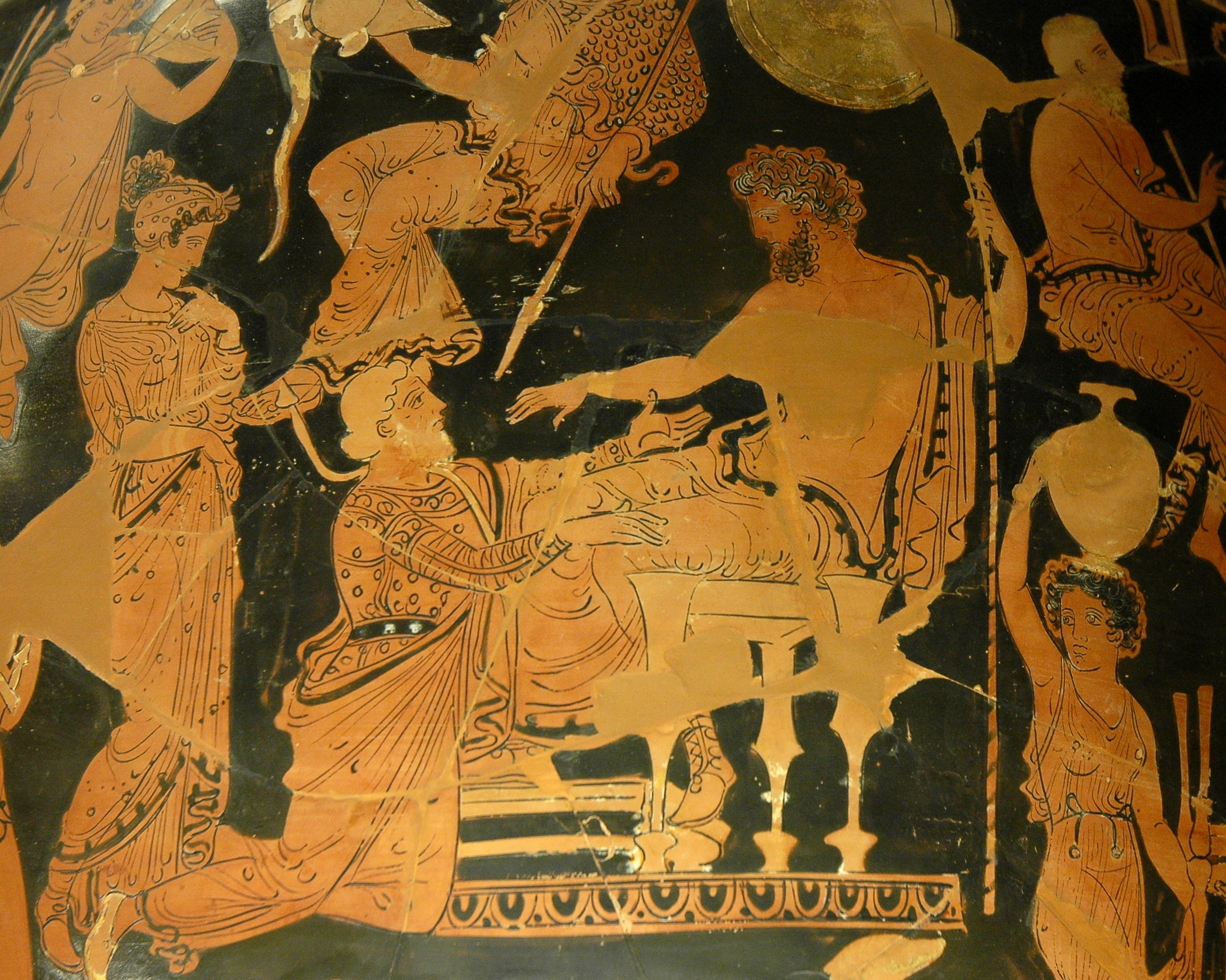
Chryses attempting to ransom his daughter Chryseis from Agamemnon, Apulian red-figure crater by the Athens 1714 Painter, ca. 360 BC–350 BC, Louvre.

In Greek mythology, Chryses (/ˈkraɪsiːz/; Greek, Χρύσης Khrýsēs, meaning "golden") was a Trojan priest of Apollo at Chryse, near the city of Troy.

== Family ==
According to a tradition mentioned by Eustathius of Thessalonica, Chryses and Briseus (father of Briseis) were brothers, sons of a man named Ardys (otherwise unknown).

== Mythology ==
During the Trojan War (prior to the actions described in Homer's Iliad), Agamemnon took Chryses' daughter Chryseis (Astynome) from Moesia as a war prize. When Chryses attempted to ransom her, Agamemnon refused to return her. Chryses prayed to Apollo, and he, in order to defend the honor of his priest, sent a plague sweeping through the Greek armies. Agamemnon was forced to give Chryseis back in order to end it. The significance of Agamemnon's actions lies not in his kidnapping Chryseis (such abductions were commonplace in ancient Greece), but in his refusal to release her upon her father's request.

== Sources ==
- Bibliotheca, Hyginus, R. Scott Smith, and Stephen M. Trzaskoma. Apollodorus' Library and Hyginus' Fabulae: two handbooks of Greek mythology. Cambridge: Hackett, 2007.
