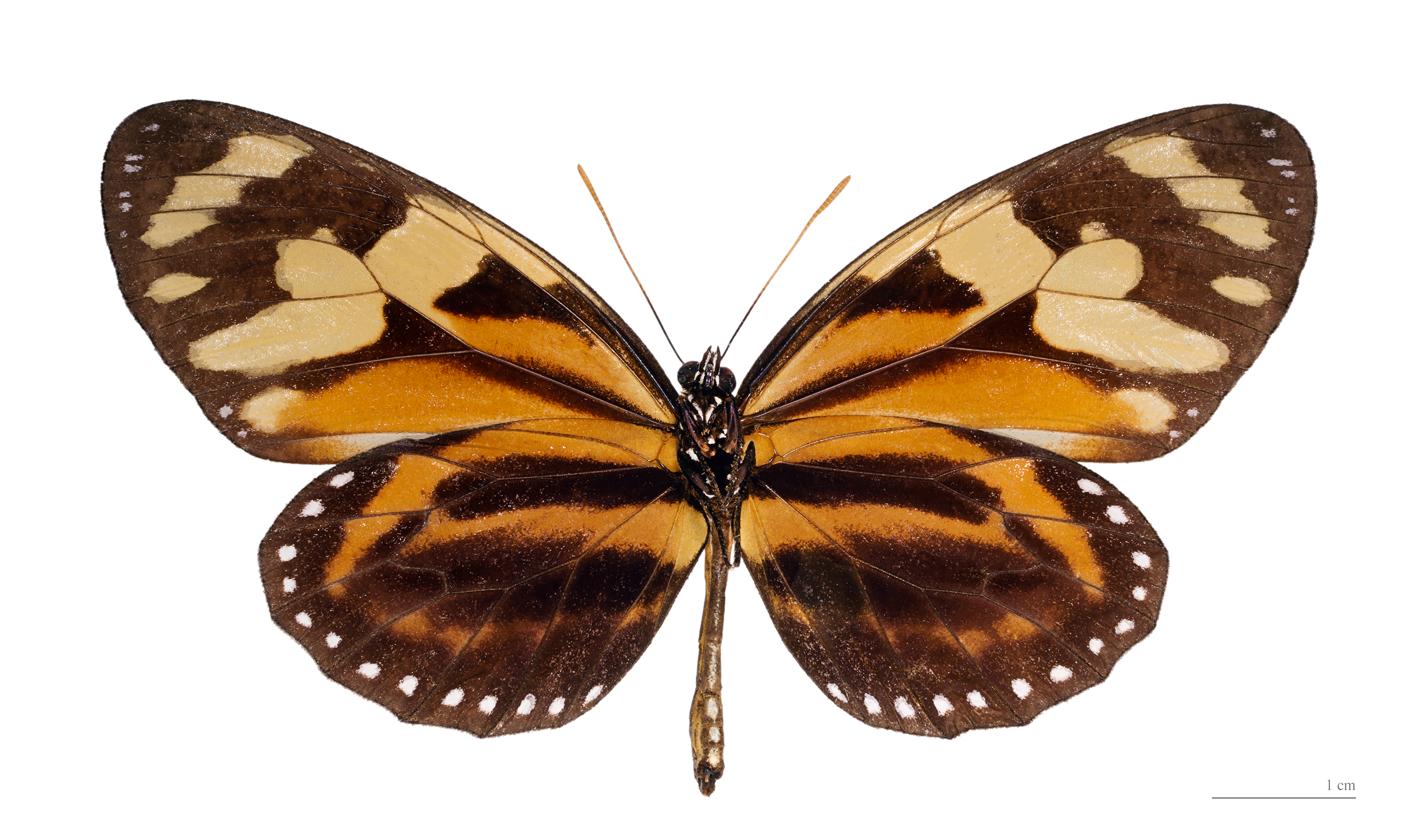

Scientific classification
- Kingdom: Animalia
- Phylum: Arthropoda
- Class: Insecta
- Order: Lepidoptera
- Family: Nymphalidae
- Genus: Lycorea
- Species: L. halia
- Subspecies: L. h. halia

Trinomial name
- Lycorea halia halia (Hübner, 1816)

Synonyms
- Eueides halia Hübner, 1816; Papilio ceres Cramer, [1776]; Lycorea halia pieteri Lamas, 1978

= Lycorea halia halia =

Subspecies of butterfly

Lycorea halia halia, the tropical milkweed butterfly, is a subspecies of Lycorea halia, also called the tropical milkweed butterfly, a nymphalid butterfly in the Danainae subfamily. It is found from Suriname, French Guiana and Peru to the Caribbean. Its habitat is tropical rainforest.
