= 1500s BC (decade) =

Decade

The 1500s BC was a decade lasting from January 1, 1509 BC to December 31, 1500 BC.

== Events and trends ==
- 1506 BC — Cecrops, legendary King of Athens, dies after a reign of 50 years. Having survived his own son, he is succeeded by Cranaus.
- c. 1506 BC — Thutmose I (Eighteenth dynasty of Egypt) starts to rule. Alternatively, a date of c. 1504 BC is a possibility.
- Egypt conquers Nubia and the Levant (1504 BC–1492 BC).
- Earliest remains of domesticated ferrets found.
- c. 1500 BC — Polynesians settle in Fiji, (controversial Fiji settlement)
- c. 1500 BC — Mycenaean civilization starts in Ancient Greece.
- c. 1500 BC — Eleusinian Mysteries start in Ancient Greece.
- c. 1500 BC — Formative/Preclassic period starts in Mesoamerica.
- c. 1500 BC: Many scholars date early parts of the Rig Veda to roughly the 16th century.
- c. 1500 BC: Queen Hatsheput in Egypt (18th Dynasty).
- c. 1500 BC: The element Mercury has been discovered in Egyptian tombs dating from this decade.
- c. 1500 BC: Settlers from Crete, Greece move to Miletus, Turkey.
- c. 1500 BC: Early traces of Maya civilization developing in Belize.
- c. 1500 BC: The Phoenicians develop an alphabet—see Timeline of communication technology.
- c. 1500 BC: Indo-Aryan migration is often dated to the 17th to 16th centuries.
- 1500 BC–500 BC—Vedas are composed.
- c. 1500 - 1479 BC: Rice was first introduced in Indonesia
