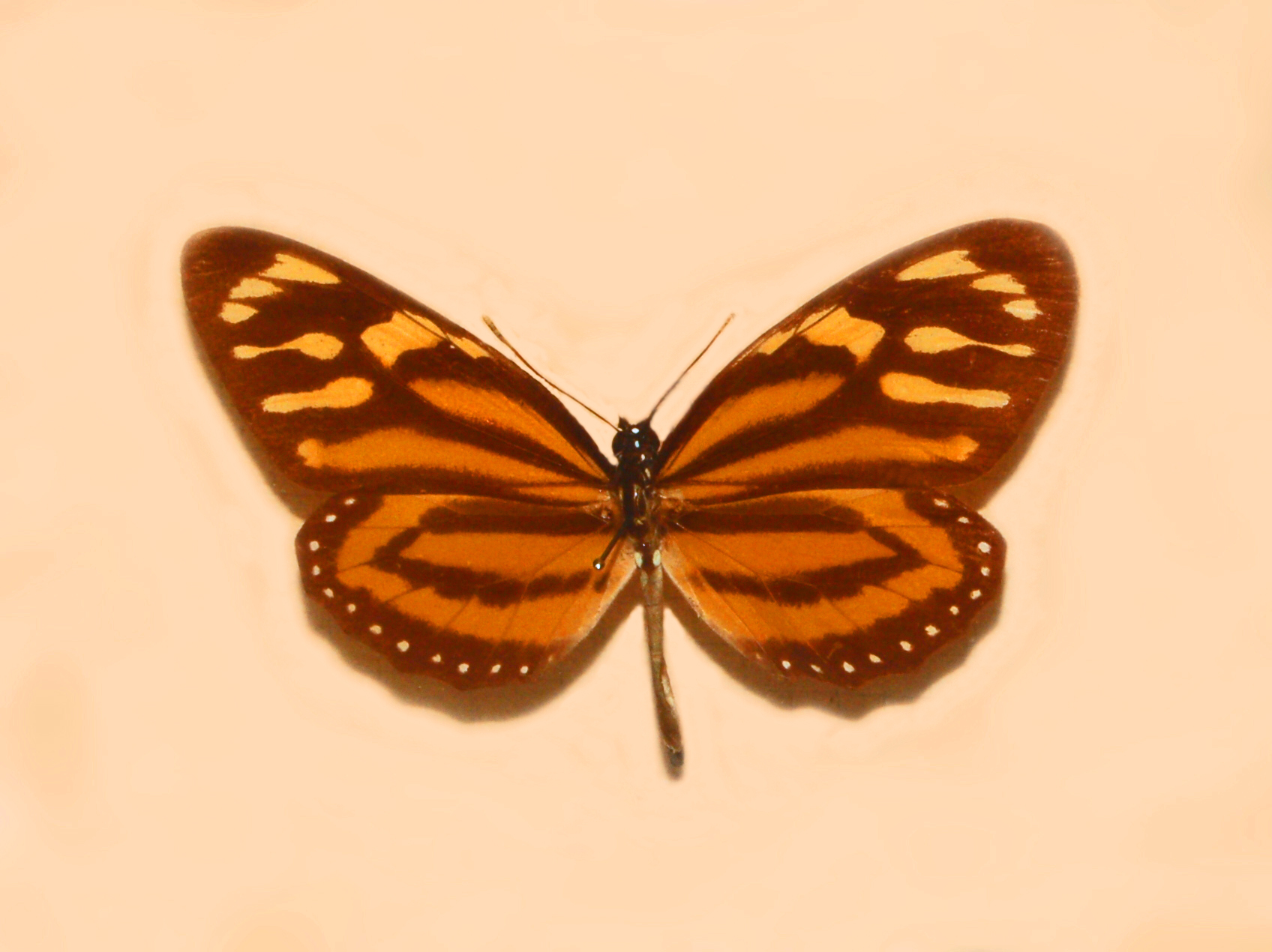

Scientific classification
- Domain: Eukaryota
- Kingdom: Animalia
- Phylum: Arthropoda
- Class: Insecta
- Order: Lepidoptera
- Family: Nymphalidae
- Genus: Lycorea
- Species: L. halia
- Subspecies: L. h. atergatis

Trinomial name
- Lycorea halia atergatis (Doubleday, 1847)

Synonyms
- Lycorea atergatis Doubleday, [1847]

= Lycorea halia atergatis =

Subspecies of butterfly

Lycorea halia atergatis, the tropical milkweed butterfly, is a subspecies of Lycorea halia, also called the tropical milkweed butterfly, a nymphalid butterfly family in the Danainae subfamily. It is found from Mexico, Venezuela and Colombia. Its habitat is tropical rainforest. It is sold commercially to collectors.
