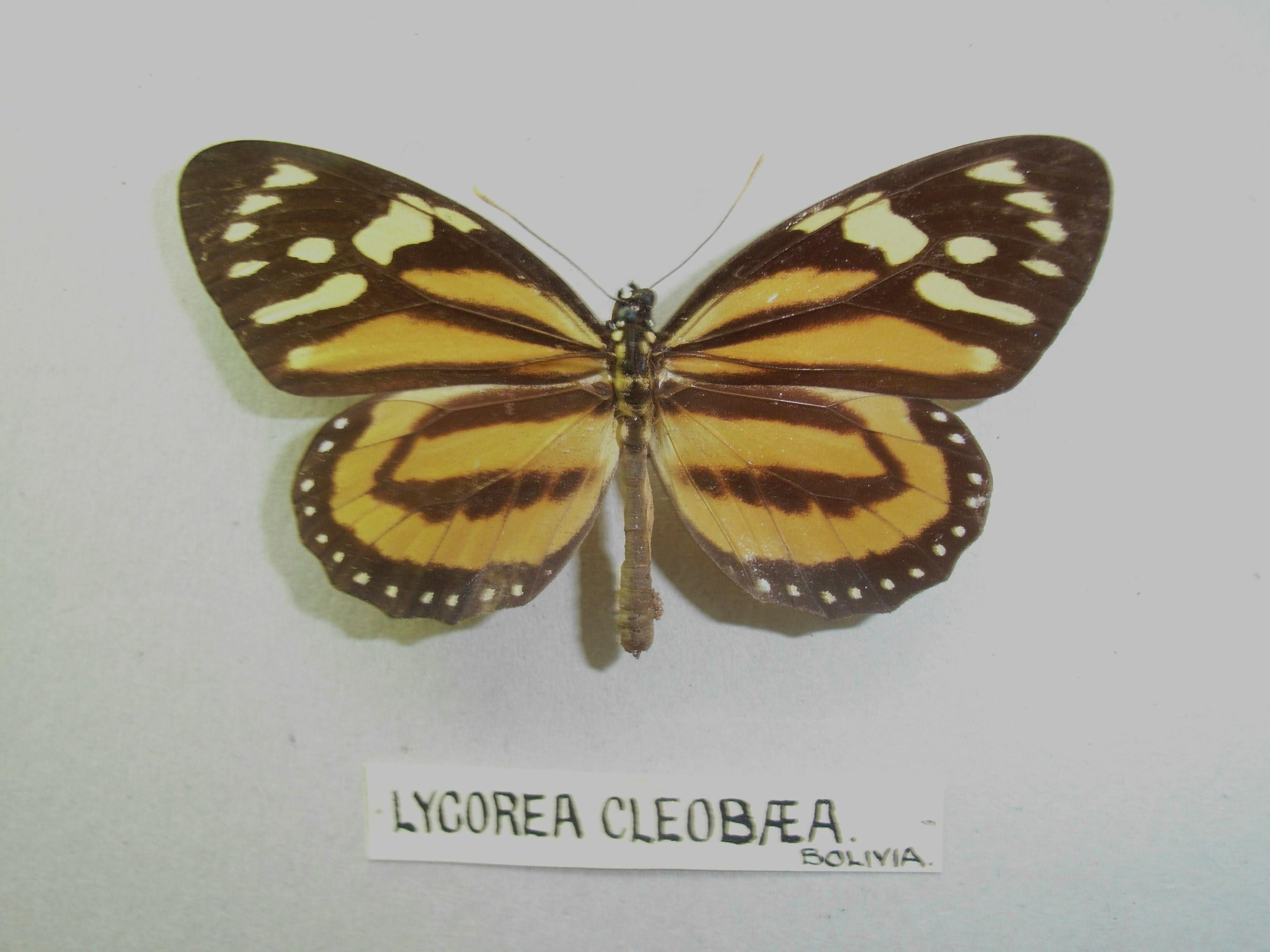

Scientific classification
- Kingdom: Animalia
- Phylum: Arthropoda
- Clade: Pancrustacea
- Class: Insecta
- Order: Lepidoptera
- Family: Nymphalidae
- Genus: Lycorea
- Species: L. halia
- Subspecies: L. h. cleobaea

Trinomial name
- Lycorea halia cleobaea (Godart, 1819)

Synonyms
- Heliconia cleobaea Godart, 1819; Lycorea halia domingensis Niepelt, 1927

= Lycorea halia cleobaea =

Subspecies of butterfly

Lycorea halia cleobaea, the tropical milkweed butterfly, is a subspecies of Lycorea halia, also called the tropical milkweed butterfly, a nymphalid butterfly in the Danainae subfamily. It is endemic to the island of Hispaniola (Haiti and the Dominican Republic) in the Caribbean. Its habitat is the tropical rainforest.
