= 1490s BC =

Decade

The 1490s BC was a decade lasting from January 1, 1499 BC to December 31, 1490 BC.

== Events and trends ==
- Egypt conquers Nubia and the Levant (1504 BC–1492 BC).
- 1500 BC: Coalescence of a number of cultural traits including undecorated pottery, megalithic burials, and millet-bean-rice agriculture indicate the beginning of the Mumun Pottery Period in the Korean Peninsula.
- 1497 BC—Cranaus, legendary King of Athens, is deposed after a reign of 10 years by his son-in-law Amphictyon of Thessaly, son of Deucalion and Pyrrha.
- 1493 BC—Thutmose I (Eighteenth dynasty of Egypt) died.
- c. 1492 BC—Thutmose I dies (other date is 1493 BC).
- 1492 BC—April 3—Lunar Saros 37 begins.
- 1491 BC—According to James Ussher's chronology, this is when Moses led the Hebrews from Egypt. This was called the Exodus.

== Significant people ==
- Thutmose II of Egypt, Pharaoh of the eighteenth dynasty of Egypt (c. 1493 BC – c. 1479 BC).
