= Briseus =

Greek mythological figure of the Trojan War

In Greek mythology, Briseus (Ancient Greek: Βρισεύς) or Brises (Βρίσης) is the father of Briseis (Hippodameia), a maiden captured by the Greeks during the Trojan War, as recorded in the Iliad. Eustathius of Thessalonica, a commentator on Homer, says Briseus and Chryses were brothers, as sons of Ardys (otherwise unknown), with Briseus dwelling in Pedasus, and Chryses residing in Chryse; both were towns in the Troad. Pedasus was said by Homer to be Lelegian settlement, ruled by the Lelegian king Altes. Thus, Briseus may also have been a Lelegian. Other sources say that Briseus was a priest of Lyrnessus. According to Dictys Cretensis, Briseus hanged himself when he lost his daughter.
