= Psamathe =

Psamathe may refer to:

== Greek mythology ==
- Psamathe (Nereid)
- Psamathe (Crotopus), Daughter of Crotopus

== Other ==
- Psamathe (moon), moon of Neptune
- Psamathe (polychaete), polychaete worm genus
- Psamathe (Leighton), 1880 painting of the Nereid by Frederic Leighton
