= Karene =

Karene may refer to:

- Karene (Mysia), a town of ancient Mysia, now in Turkey
- Karene District, in Sierra Leone
- Karene Peter (born 1991), English actress
- Karene Reid (born 2000), American football player
