= Homeric prayer =

Prayer features prominently in the works of Homer. In the Iliad and the Odyssey, gods are portrayed as coexisting and often interfering with the world of the human characters, who often communicate with the gods through prayer. Gods usually hear, often react to and sometimes grant human prayers.

== The power of prayer ==
Homeric prayers, which often signal moments at which the fictional characters face extreme threats, determine the events of the plot. In these situations, the gods may literally grant a prayer by interceding on behalf of the mortal. This can include sending a plague to erode an invading army's morale or stopping the wind to prevent ships from sailing.

In the Iliad, Phoenix comments upon the power of prayer, saying that "the very immortals can be moved; their virtue and honor and strength are greater than ours are, and yet with sacrifices and offerings for endearment, with libations and with savor men turn back even the immortals in supplication, when any man does wrong and transgresses".

== Prayer as a ritual ==
Formal Greek prayer in the epic poems attributed to Homer is ritualized and consists of four basic stages: cleansing, prayer, sacrifice and libation. First, a mortal washes their hands, purifying themselves. They then attain an appropriate posture, lifting their arms. They address their gods directly, praise the divine omnipotence of the Olympians. Finally, they remind the gods of the already established relationship between the supplicant and the divine in an effort to deem themselves worthy of their god's attention. The characters are now ready to verbally announce their noble wish to be granted and proceed to offer mostly in form of a sacrifice an act of submission.

== Examples in the Iliad ==
In his prayer to Apollo (Iliad, I, 445–457), Chryses, a priest of the god in Anatolia, washes his hands and lifts them prior to requesting fulfillment of his wish. He admits his lower status in relation to the god, "who set your power about Chryse and Killa the sacrosanct, who are lord in strength over Tenedos" (Iliad, I, 451–3).

Similar is Achilles' prayer to Zeus. Achilles holds a ritual, purifies himself, pours wine to his god, addresses Zeus in words of commendation and admits the nobler nature of the divinity through contrasting the father of gods with the unpurified humans of "unwashed feet".

Glaukos, co-leader of the Lycian forces, (XVI, 533) prays on the battlefield, requesting healing of his wounds to “fight for Sarpedon”. The practical part of the rite is not performed.

In the Trojan women's prayer to Athena in the sixth book of the Iliad, Hecuba seems to mechanically carry out the ritual without realizing the significance of its constituent stages, which diminishes the spirituality of her actions. She is about to offer "honey sweet wine, to pour out a libation to father Zeus and the other immortals" (Iliad, VI, 258–9) to Hector, who had not previously been cleansed. Offering is encountered in the form of a material gift, a robe, to Athene. The priestess lifts the hands to the sky, home of gods, and exalts Athena as "shining among the goddesses".

== Examples in the Odyssey ==
After being blinded by Odysseus, Polyphemus prays to his father Poseidon that Odysseus not find his way home to Ithaca (9.528-535). Poseidon then interferes with Odysseus' travels, setting the stage for the rest of the poem.

== See also ==
- List of characters in the Iliad
- Epic poetry
