= Pedias =

In Greek mythology, Pedias (Ancient Greek: Πεδιάς, lit. 'flat' or 'level') was the Lacedamonian daughter of Mynes. She married the autochthonous King Cranaus who reigned in Athens and bore him three daughters: Cranaë, Cranaechme, and Atthis.
