= Eetion =

Greek mythological king

In Greek mythology, Eëtion or Eetion (/iˈiːti.ɒn/; Ancient Greek: Ἠετίων, romanized: Ēetíōn or Ietíon [ɛː.e.tí.ɔːn]) is the king of the Anatolian city of Cilician Thebe. He is said to be the father of Andromache, the wife of the Trojan prince Hector. In the sixth book of the Iliad, Andromache tells her husband that a raid took place upon Thebe, in which Achilles murdered her father and his seven sons.

== Family ==
Eetion is described as the father of Andromache, who becomes the wife of the Trojan prince Hector, as well as seven sons. Homer also mentions a figure named Eetion who is the father of Podes.

== Mythology ==
In the first book of the Iliad, he is described as the king of the city of Cilician Thebe, in the region of Mysia in Anatolia. In the sixth book of the Iliad, Andromache tearily tells her husband of an attack which was mounted against Thebe by the Greeks. She relates that Achilles killed her father, Eetion, also murdering his seven sons. Not feeling it right to plunder Eetion's armour, Achilles put him on the funeral pyre fully attired.

His wife is never named, but Andromache relates that she was captured in the same raid in which Eëtion was killed, though she later met her demise at the hands of Artemis. However, a certain Astynome, also called Chryseis, was said to be the wife of Eetion at that time. She was carried off by Achilles and later became the war prize of Agamemnon.

In the Greeks' raid on the city, they stole goods which included a horse named Pedasus, a musical instrument called a phorminx, as well as a disc which later featured in the funeral games in honour of Patroclus.

The author of Iliad was likely familiar with sources which related Achilles' raid upon the city.
