= Thebe Hypoplakia =

Ancient city in Mysia or Aiolis, mentioned by Homer

Coordinates: 39°35′51″N 27°01′13″E

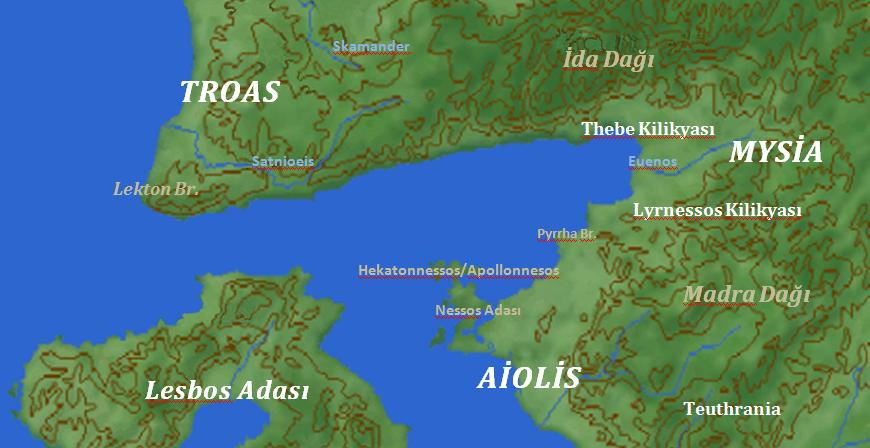
Location of Thebe in the Edremit gulf.

Thebe Hypoplakia (Ancient Greek: Ὑποπλακίη Θήβη, romanized: Hypoplakíē Thḗbē), also Placian Thebe (Ancient Greek: Πλακία Θήβη, romanized: Plakía Thḗbē), was a city in ancient Anatolia. Alternative names include Placia, Hypoplacia and Hypoplacian Thebe(s), referring to the city's position at the foot of Mount Placus, near the local village "Tepeoba".

== Geography ==
Strabo places it at 60 stadia from Adramyttium. Pomponius Mela says it was between Adramyttium and Cisthene. Josef Stauber places it in Paşa Dağ, 2 kilometres (1.2 mi) northeast of Edremit, Balıkesir, however in another previous publication he places it in Küçuk Çal Tepe. The editors of the Barrington Atlas of the Greek and Roman World settle on a site 1 mile (1.6 km) north-northeast of Edremit.

Strabo places Thebes and Lyrnessus "in what was later called the Theban plain." He highlights the fertility and richness of this plain, as do Herodotus, Xenophon, Polybius, and Livy. Historians such as Walter Leaf have speculated on its location, but have not managed to identify the plain nor the city. Strabo, without specifying the time, reports that, due to their fertility, the Theban plain was disputed by the Mysians and Lydians, and later the Greeks who colonized it coming from Aeolis and from the island of Lesbos. He adds that in his times, the second century, the plain was occupied by the people of Adramyttium.

The place name differs according to some Greek authors: Ὑποπλάκιος Θήβη. Θήβη, Θήβαι, Θήβα Πλακία, and Θῆβε.

The only mentions in the archaic and classical ages to Thebes as a polis (city-state), are connected with the Homeric tradition. However, Quintus Curtius Rufus refers to Thebes as "urbs", retrospectively in the context of the fourth century BCE.

== History ==
Herodotus expressly mentions Thebe in a passage from a chapter of his account of the Second Persian invasion of Greece. He refers that the army of the Achaemenid king Xerxes I on its way to the invasion of continental Greece, went from Lydia towards the Caicus and the region of Mysia, through the territory of Atarneus to the city of Carene, and after passing it the troops went up the coast to the north, then went northeast, along the coastal route that contoured the Sinus Adramyttius, until reaching Adramyttium, a city located in the fertile plain of Thebe.

In the 4th century BCE, Thebe minted coins in bronze on which the legends «ΘΗΒ» or «ΘΗΒΑ» appear.

== Mythology ==
According to one account, the city of Thebe was founded by the hero Heracles after his sack of Troy during the reign of King Laomedon and named after his birthplace, Thebes in Boeotia. At the time of the Trojan War, Hypoplacian Thebe was in the hands of a people known as the Cilicians, and ruled by King Eetion. Eetion's daughter Andromache was given in marriage to Hector, son of King Priam of Troy. The Achaeans, led by Achilles, sacked the city during the latter part of the war, killed King Eetion, his wife and his sons. They also carried off several women, including Chryseis, who became the concubine of Agamemnon. Chryseis's father attempts to ransom his daughter, initiating the plot of Homer's Iliad. One of Achilles' horses, Pedasus, also came from Thebe.

== See also ==
- Ancient sites of Balıkesir
