= Mynes (mythology) =

Two individuals in Greek mythology

In Greek mythology, Mynes (Ancient Greek: Μύνης, lit. 'diverting') may refer to two individuals:

- Mynes, the Lacedamonian father of Pedias, wife of the autochthonous King Cranaus of Athens, who bore him three daughters: Cranaë, Cranaechme, and Atthis.
- Mynes, king of the city of Lyrnessus which was sacked by Achilles, who there captured his wife, Briseis. Mynes was son of King Evenus, son of Selepus.
