= Psamathe (Leighton) =

Painting by Frederic Leighton

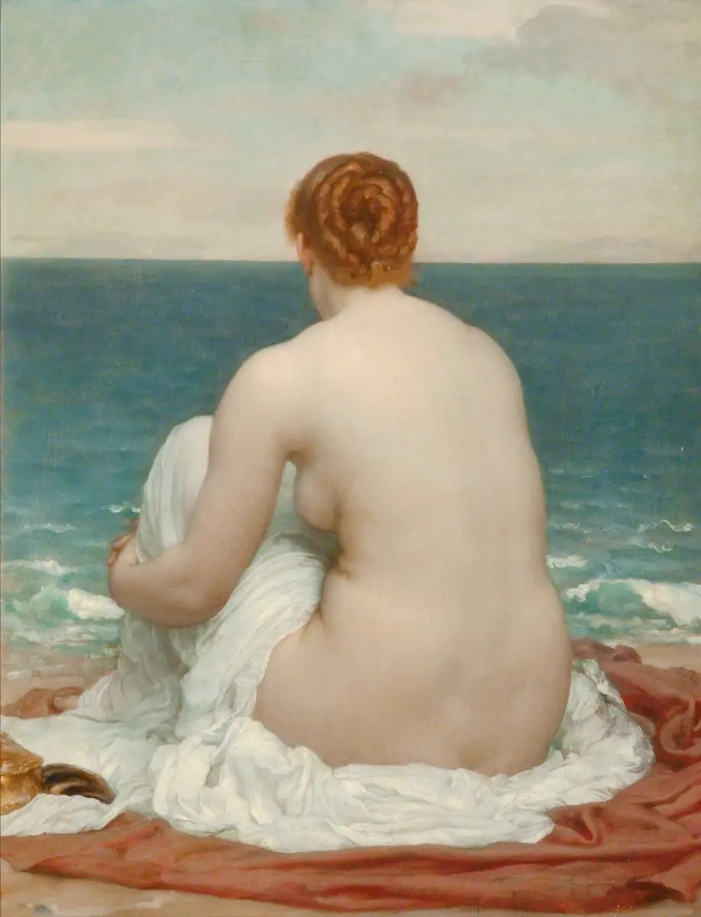
- Artist: Frederic Leighton
- Year: 1879–80
- Medium: Oil on canvas
- Dimensions: 85 cm × 66.5 cm (33 in × 26.2 in)
- Location: Lady Lever Art Gallery

Psamathe is an oil painting by Frederic Leighton, first exhibited in 1880.

== Background ==
The Sister's Kiss, The Light of the Harem, Iostephane, Psamathe, and The Nymph of the Dargle were Leighton's principal pictures in 1880.

== Description ==
Psamathe is a purely classical composition. The subject is the Greek maiden, Psamathe, who was one of the Nereides. The artist has painted her sitting alone by the seashore, gazing over the Aegean, with her back turned to the spectator.

== Analysis ==
Ernest Rhys writes, "Filmy garments, which have slipped from her shoulders on to the sand; arms folded about her knees; every detail of the picture carries out the effect of dreamy loveliness that pervades Psamathe and her surroundings."

Edgcumbe Staley writes, "She appears to be gazing fixedly over the blue waves. Her thin Grecian draperies reveal her exquisite figure, as she crouches, arms over knees, in a state of dreamy loveliness."

== Sources ==
- Jones, Stephen, et al. (1996). Frederic Leighton, 1830–1896. Royal Academy of Arts, London: Harry N. Abrams, Inc. pp. 189–90, 214.
- Rhys, Ernest (1900). Frederic Lord Leighton: An Illustrated Record of his Life and Work. London: George Bell & Sons. pp. 41–42, 127.
- Staley, Edgcumbe (1906). Lord Leighton of Stretton. London: The Walter Scott Publishing Co., Ltd.; New York: Charles Scribner's Sons. pp. 117–18.
- "Psamathe". The Victorian Web. 5 August 2015. Accessed 4 August 2022.
