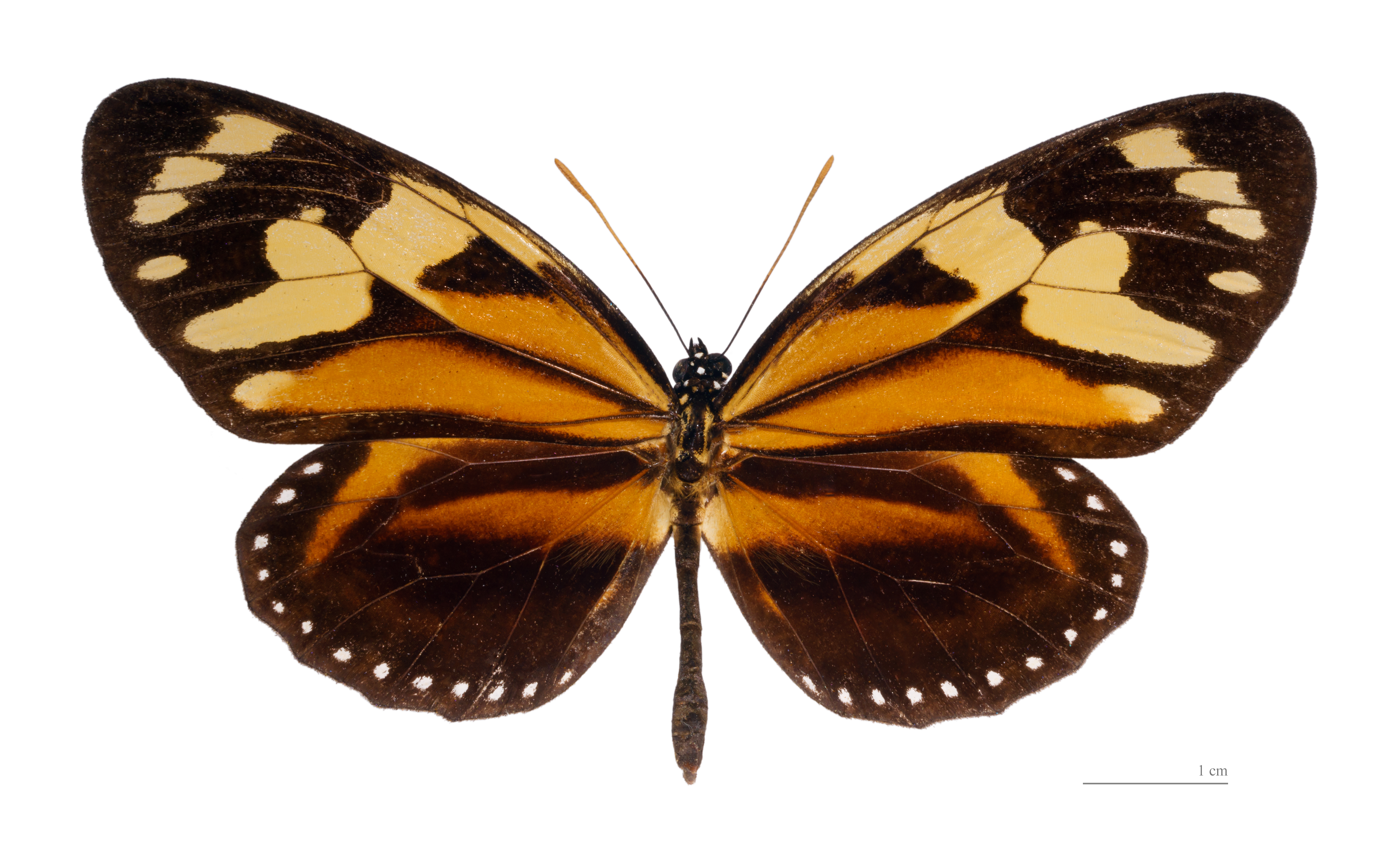
- From MHNT
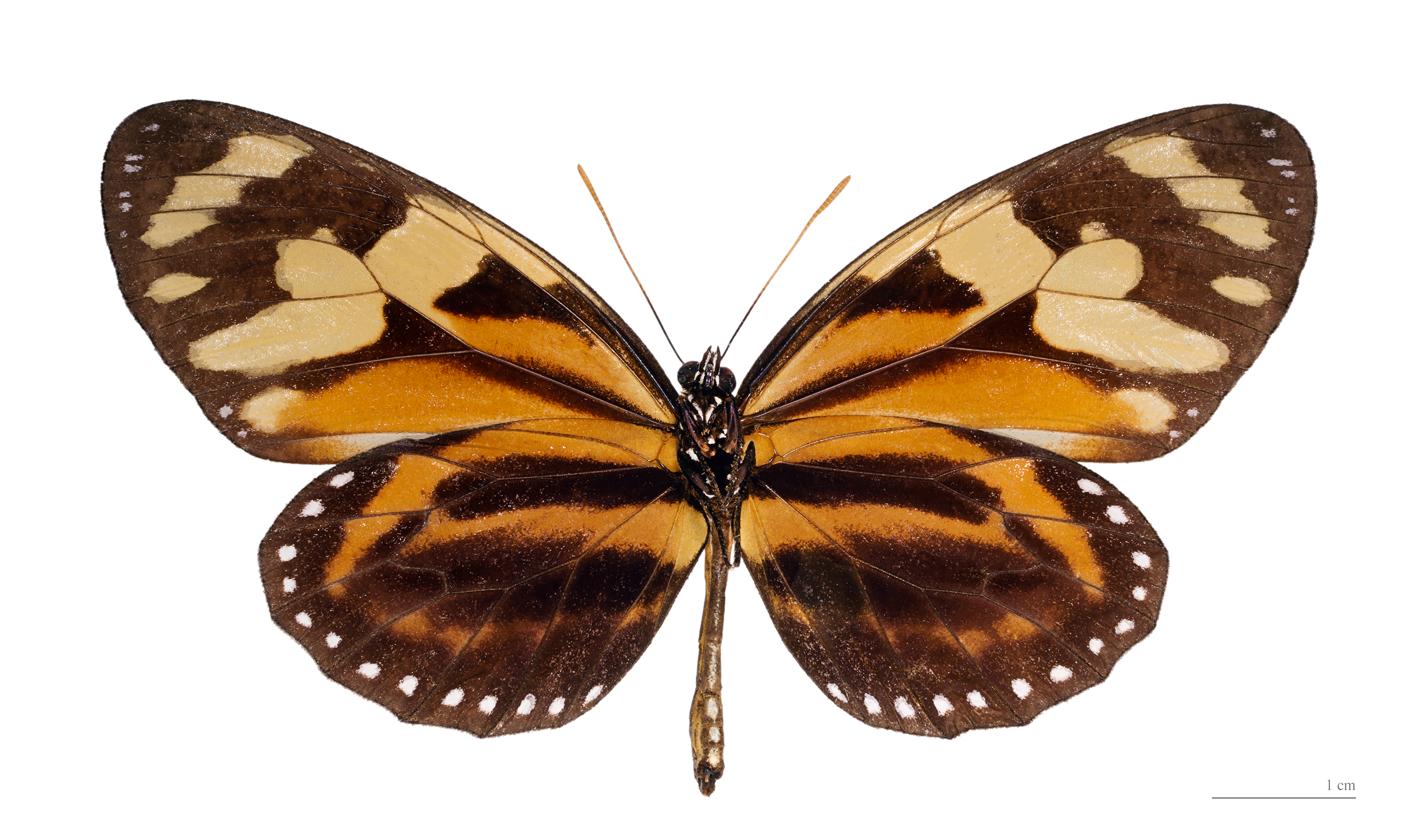
- Ventral view, same specimen

Scientific classification
- Domain: Eukaryota
- Kingdom: Animalia
- Phylum: Arthropoda
- Class: Insecta
- Order: Lepidoptera
- Family: Nymphalidae
- Genus: Lycorea
- Species: L. halia

Binomial name
- Lycorea halia (Hübner, 1816)

Synonyms
- Eueides halia Hübner, 1816; Papilio ceres Cramer, [1776]; Lycorea halia pieteri Lamas, 1978; Heliconia cleobaea Godart, [1819]; Lycorea halia domingensis Niepelt, 1927; Lycorea atergatis Doubleday, [1847]; Lycorea cleobaea roqueana Bryk, 1953; Lycorea halia minuscula Bryk, 1953

= Lycorea halia =

Tropical milkweed butterfly

Species of butterfly

Lycorea halia, the tropical milkweed butterfly (also known as tiger-mimic queen), is a species of nymphalid butterfly in the Danainae subfamily. It is found from Peru to the Caribbean and Mexico. Strays can be found as far north as Texas. The habitat consists of rainforest.

The wingspan is about 95–108 mm. Adults feed on bird droppings.

The larvae feed on Carica papaya, Ficus carica, Asclepias curassavica and Jacaratia.

== Subspecies ==
- L. h. halia (Suriname, French Guiana)
- L. h. cleobaea (Godart, 1819) (Antilles, Dominican Republic)
- L. h. atergatis Doubleday, [1847] (Mexico to Venezuela, Colombia)
- L. h. pales C. & R. Felder, 1862 (Peru, Brazil (Acre))
- L. h. demeter C. & R. Felder, 1865 (Cuba)
- L. h. cinnamomea Weymer, 1883 (Brazil (Amazonas))
- L. h. discreta Haensch, 1909 (Brazil (Minas Gerais, Rio de Janeiro, Bahia))
- L. h. fasciata Haensch, 1909 (Ecuador)
- L. h. transiens Riley, 1919 (Brazil (Amazonas))
- L. h. [n. ssp.#2] Lamas, (Trinidad)

== Gallery ==
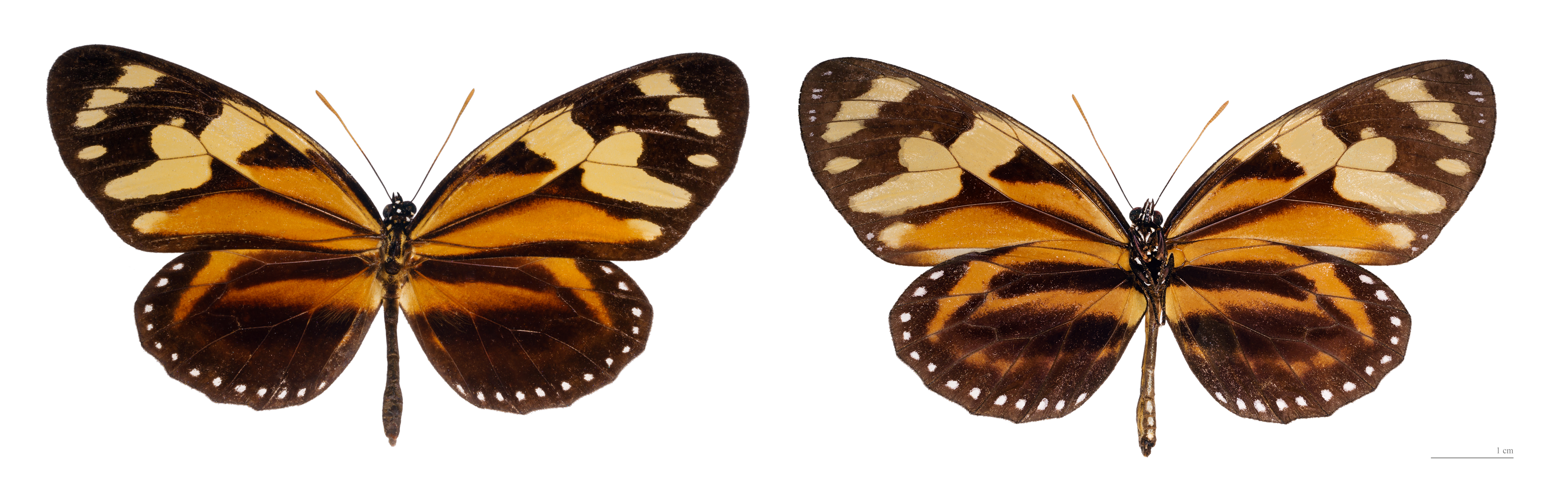
L. h. halia French Guiana

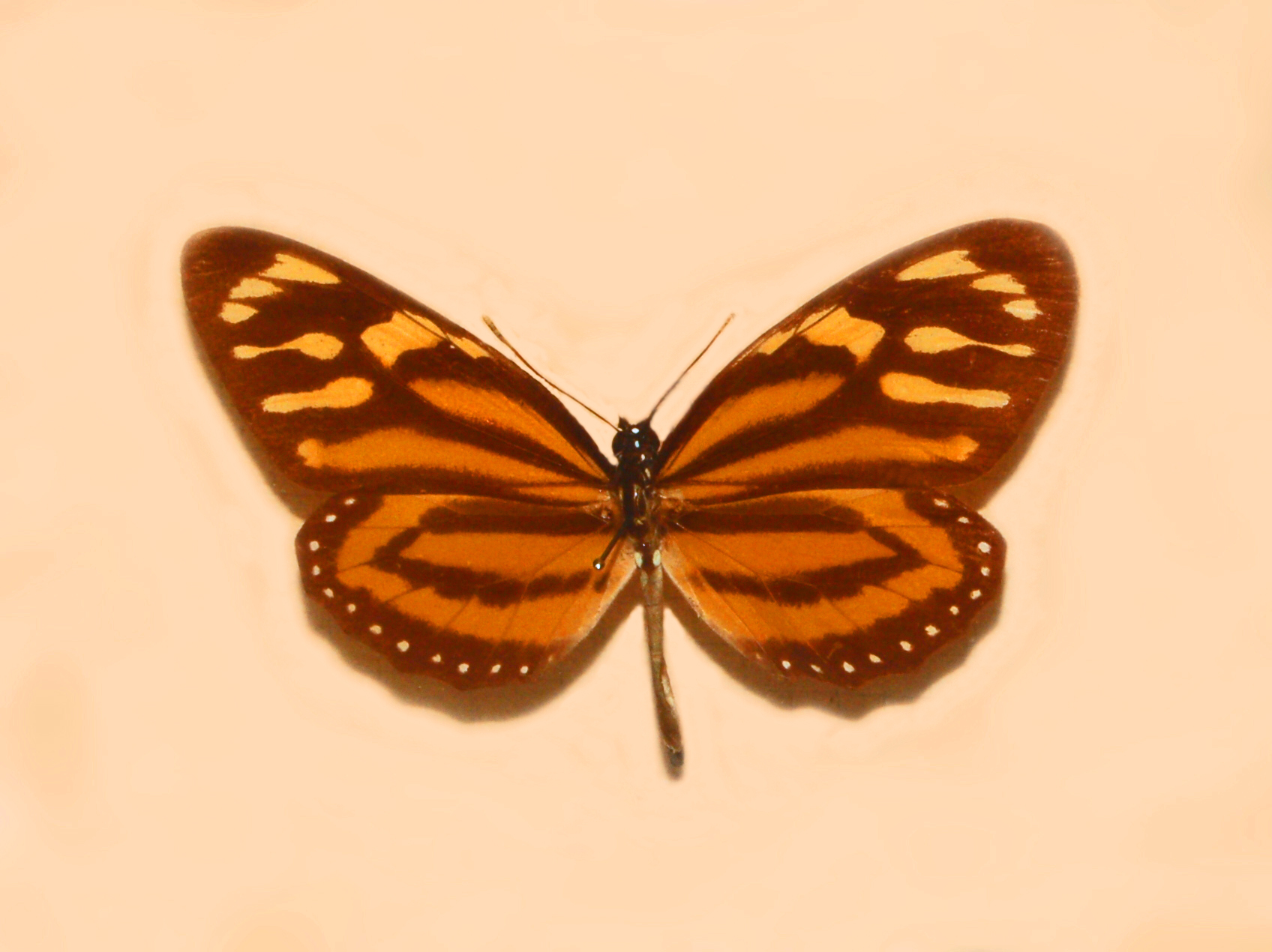
L. h. atergalis Colombia

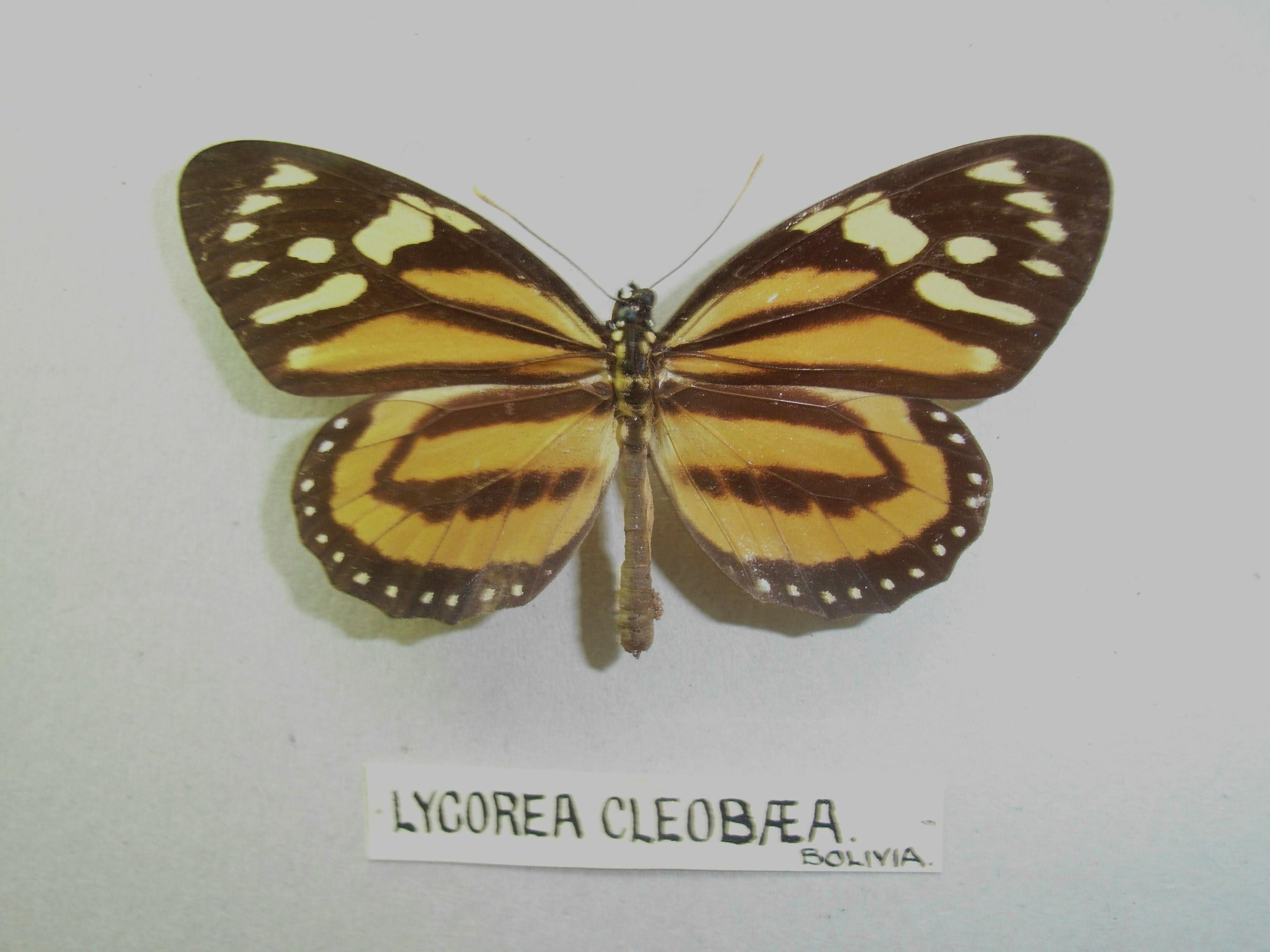
L. h. cleobaea

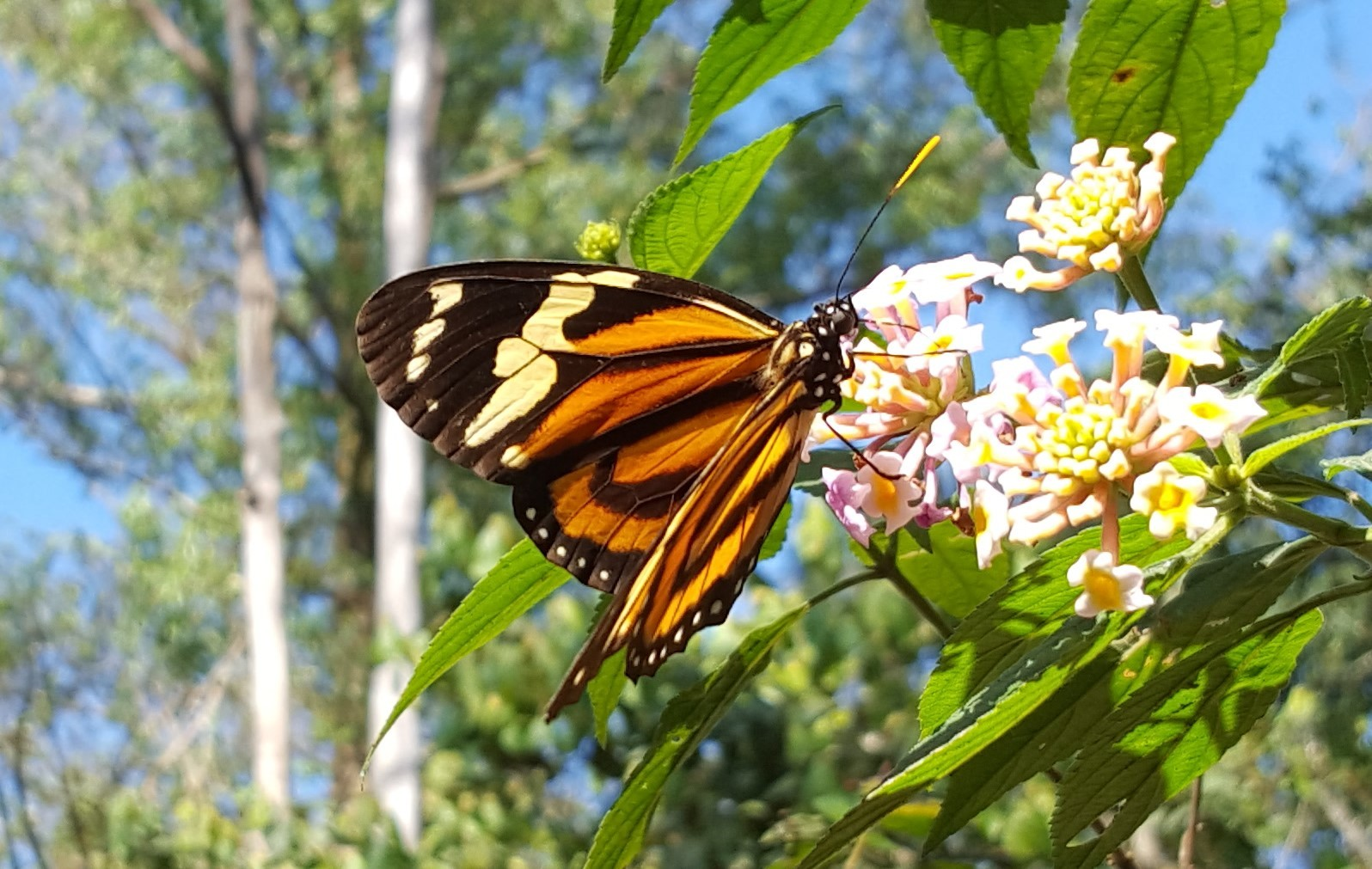
Feeding

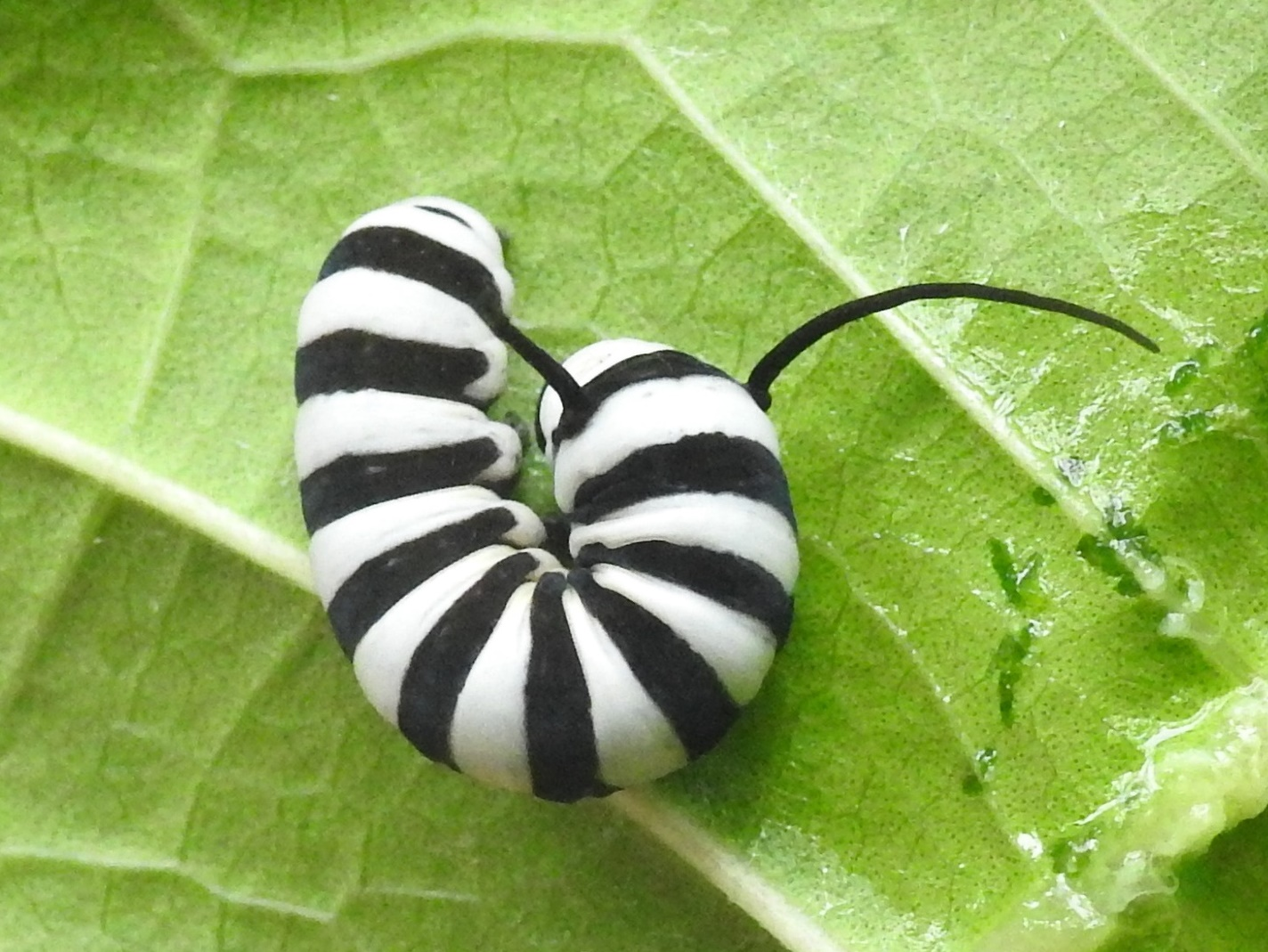
caterpillar
