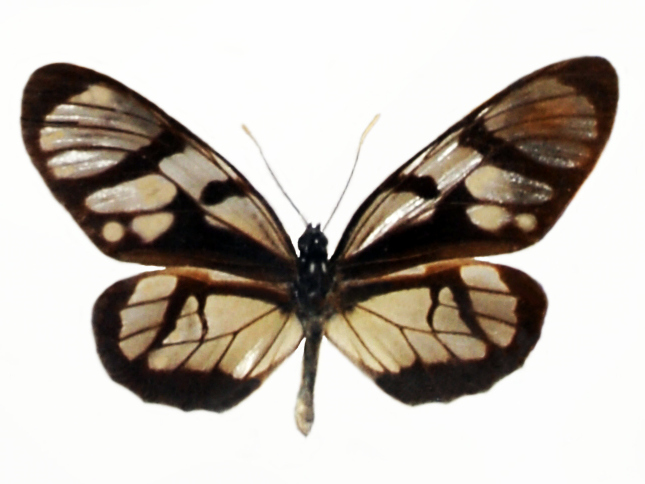
- Lycorea ilione phenarete

Scientific classification
- Domain: Eukaryota
- Kingdom: Animalia
- Phylum: Arthropoda
- Class: Insecta
- Order: Lepidoptera
- Family: Nymphalidae
- Genus: Lycorea
- Species: L. ilione

Binomial name
- Lycorea ilione Cramer, 1775

Synonyms
- Papilio ilione Cramer, 1775; Ituna phenarete Doubleday, 1847; Ituna lamirus Latreille, 1817; Ituna albescens Distant, 1876; Ituna completa Staudinger, 1885; Ituna lanassa Godman & Salvin, 1897; Ituna decolorata Haensch, 1909; Ituna fenestrata Haensch, 1909; Ituna juncta Dufrane, 1948; Ituna lamiridia Bryk, 1953; Ituna phenaretidia Bryk, 1953

= Lycorea ilione =

Species of butterfly

Lycorea ilione, the clearwing mimic queen is a species of nymphalid butterfly in the subfamily Danainae. The species was first described by Pieter Cramer in 1775.

== Subspecies ==
Subspecies include:

- Lycorea ilione albescens (Distant, 1876); present in Mexico and Central America to Panama.
- Lycorea ilione decolorata (Haensch, 1909); present in Ecuador
- Lycorea ilione ilione (nominate); present in Brazil
- Lycorea ilione lamirus (Latreille, [1817]); present in Peru
- Lycorea ilione suffusca Winhard, 2019; present in Colombia
- Lycorea ilione phenarete (Doubleday, 1847); present in Bolivia and Peru

== Distribution and habitat ==
This species is present in Mexico, Guatemala, Colombia, Ecuador, Brazil, Bolivia and Peru. It occurs in the transitional rainforest and cloudforest, at an elevation of 500–1,500 metres (1,600–4,900 ft) above sea level.

== Description ==
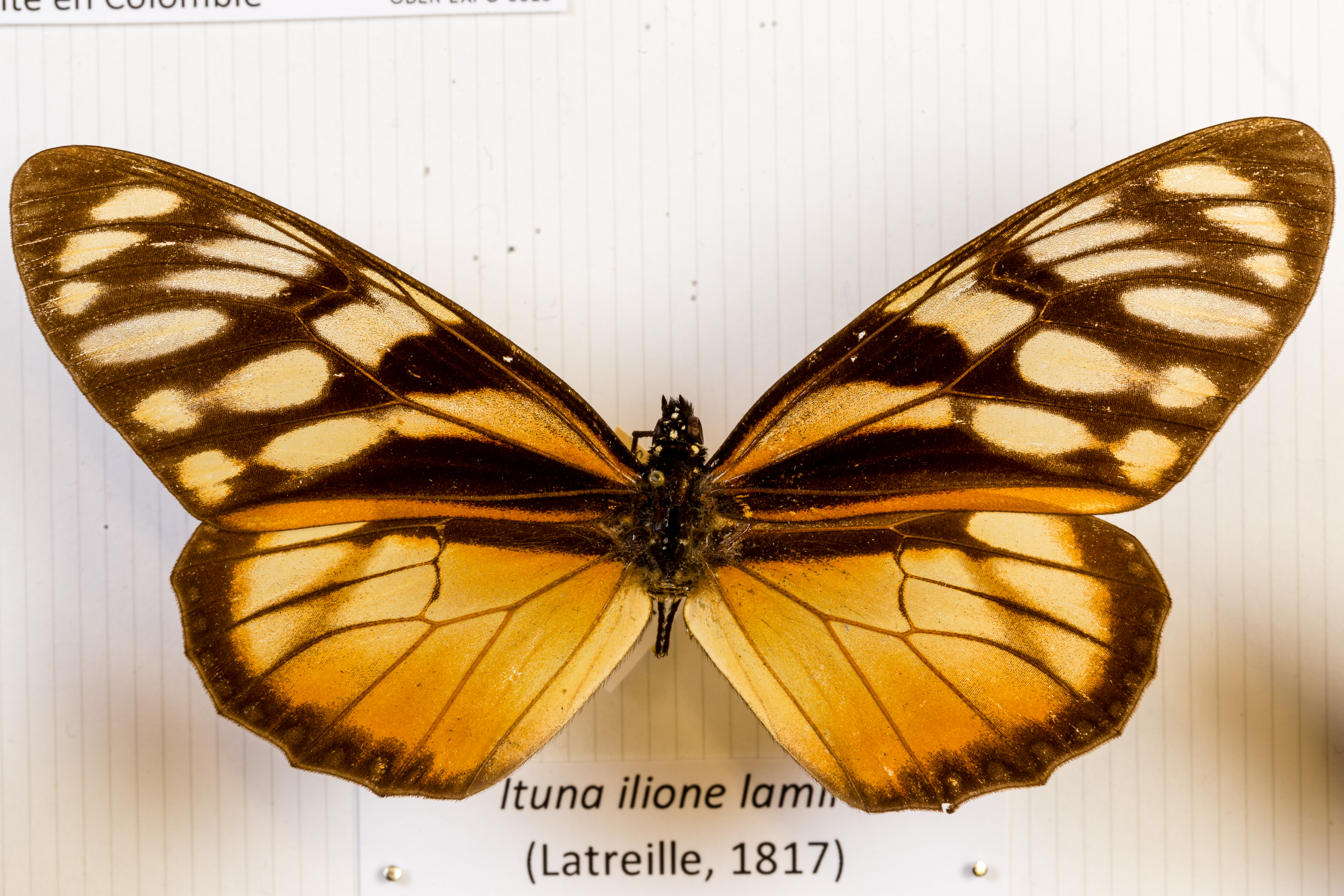
Lycorea ilione lamira

Lycorea ilione can reach a wingspan of about 10 cm (3.9 in). It is an extremely variable species. These large and strongly marked butterflies show yellow-tipped antennae and black thorax with white dots and gray abdomen. All wings are rounded, with forewings much longer than the hindwings and with concave inner edge. The wings are transparent, bordered with black, with black veins and dark bands dividing the wings into several areas. Some subspecies are brown with brown basal part of the forewings.

== Biology ==
The larvae mainly feed on Ficus species (F. benjamina, F. carica and F. pumila), but also on Jacaratia hasslerina, Carica papaya and Myoporum lactum. Males feed on Senecio, Eupatorium and Neomiranda flowers from which they obtain alkaloids used for chemical defense, as these toxins cause nausea in birds that prey them.
