= Podes =

Character in the Greek epic poem the Iliad

In Greek mythology, Podes (Ancient Greek: Ποδής, romanized: Podēs) was the son of Eetion, and thus the brother of Andromache, the wife of Hector, whom he is said to have been a feast friend of.

== Traditional treatment ==
Podes fought on the side of the Trojans in the Trojan War, and was killed by Menelaus. However, in Book 6 of the Iliad, Andromache claims that her seven brothers have been killed by Achilles. This contradiction is not resolved.

According to Athenaeus, the term feast friend was more akin to a parasite and flatterer ("Kolax" in Greek), which is why it was symbolic for Menelaus to wound him in the stomach.
