= Discovery of Fiji =

Located in the central Pacific Ocean, Fiji's geography has made it both a destination and a crossroads for migrations for many centuries.

== Melanesian and Polynesian settlement ==
Austronesian peoples, who were from the Lapita Culture have settled in the Fijian islands some 3,500 years ago, with Melanesians following around a thousand years later. Most authorities agree that they originated in Southeast Asia and came via Malay Archipelago. Archeological evidence shows signs of settlement on Moturiki from 600 BC and possibly as far back as 900 BC.

In the 10th century, the Tu'i Tonga Empire was established in Tonga, and Fiji came within its sphere of influence. The Tongan influence brought Polynesian customs and language into Fiji. The empire began to decline in the 13th century.

The Fiji Times reported on 3 July 2005 that recent research by the Fiji Museum and the University of the South Pacific (USP) has found that skeletons excavated at Bourewa, near Natadola in Sigatoka, at least 3000 years old, belonged to the first settlers of Fiji, with their origins in South China or Taiwan. The skeletons are to be sent to Japan for assembling and further research. Obsidian, a rare volcanic glass found only in Papua New Guinea had been discovered there, according to Dr Patrick D. Nunn, USP Professor of Ocean Science and Geography, who theorized that the people could originally have left southern China or Taiwan some 7000 years ago, settling in Papua New Guinea before drifting on to Fiji and other countries. Lapita pottery found on the surface of the graves was almost 2500 years old, he said. Fiji Museum archaeologist Sepeti Matararaba said that the area beside the sea must have been occupied, because a great deal of pottery, hunting tools, and ancient shell jewellery had been discovered. More than 20 pits had been dug following the discovery of lapita in the area.

On 15 July 2005, it was reported that the same teams had uncovered 16 skeletons at Bourewa, near Natadola. The skeletons were found in a layer of undisturbed soil containing pottery from around 550 BC. Professor Nunn said there was now abundant evidence that Bourewa had been the first human settlement in the Fiji archipelago, occupied from around 1200 BC onwards. "Lapita people were the first people to come to Fiji, Vanuatu, New Caledonia, Tonga and Samoa. These people left evidence of their existence by mainly their elaborately decorated and finely fashioned pottery," Nunn said. He said the evidence pointed to Papua New Guinea or the Solomon Islands as the place from where the earliest Fijians came, as the pottery fragments were typical of the early Lapita period in Papua New Guinea and the Solomons, but not readily found on Lapita Pottery in Fiji.

Nunn announced on 9 November 2005 that a black obsidian rock discovered near Natadola in southwest Viti Levu had originated in the Kutau-Bao obsidian mine on Talasea Peninsula on the island of New Britain, in Papua New Guinea, some 4500 kilometers away. Although carried throughout the Western Pacific by the Lapita people, it is not often found in Fiji. The obsidian, which showed signs of being "worked," probably arrived soon after the initial Lapita settlement in Bourewa circa 1150 BC, Nunn said. He theorized that it was kept by the Lapita settlers as a talisman, a reminder of where they had come from.

Fiji Television reported on 20 March 2006 that an ancient Fijian village, believed to have been occupied by chiefs sometime between 1250 and 1560, had been discovered at Kuku, in Nausori. Its heavily fortified battle fort contained unique features not seen elsewhere in Fiji. Archeologist Sepeti Matararaba of the Fiji Museum expressed astonishment at some of the discoveries at the site, which included an iron axe used by white traders in exchange for Fijian artefacts. Local villages were reported to be rebuilding the site with a view to opening it up to tourists in July 2006.

== European discovery (18th century) ==
Dutch navigator Abel Tasman was the first known European to record the location of Fiji, sighting the northern island of Vanua Levu and about 15 of the islands in the North Taveuni archipelago in 1643. Abel Tasman did not land on any of these islands, and did not see or interact with any of the natives. James Cook, the British navigator, on his second voyage sighted, charted, and landed on Vatoa, the most southern and easterly island of the southern Lau islands of Fiji in 1774. He spotted natives on the reef and a few more on the shore, but was not able to find an opening into the island's lagoon. Cook lowered a long boat and five men rowed to the shore over a shallow gap in the reef, but by the time they landed the natives had run away into the tropical forest. The crew stayed on shore calling, and with no response left behind four metal cups and a knife as gifts. It was not until 1789, however, that the largest of the Fiji islands were charted and plotted, when William Bligh, the castaway captain of the mutiny of his ship, HMS Bounty, passed Ovalau and sailed between the main islands of Viti Levu and Vanua Levu en route to Batavia, in what is now Indonesia. Bligh Water, the strait between the two main islands, is named after him, and for a time, the Fiji Islands were known as the "Bligh Islands." Bligh, being in a 23 foot long open boat was very vulerable, and was chased natives in canoes on three occasions as he tansited the "Bligh Water". Bligh did not land, nor did he interact with any natives on this trip. However, on August 6, 1792 on his return trip to Fiji to gather Breadfruit trees, he continued to chart and map the islands. On this trip Bligh did land on several islands and was likley the first European to record interacting with the natives of Fiji.

The first Europeans to settle among the Fijians were shipwrecked sailors and runaway convicts from Australian penal colonies. In 1804, the discovery of sandalwood on the southwestern coast of Vanua Levu led to an increase in the number and frequency of Western trading ships visiting Fiji. A sandalwood rush began in the first few years but it dried up when supplies dropped between 1810 and 1814. By 1820, the traders returned for beche-de-mer or sea cucumber. In the early 1820s, Levuka was established as the first European-style town in Fiji, on the island of Ovalau.
