= 1470s BC =

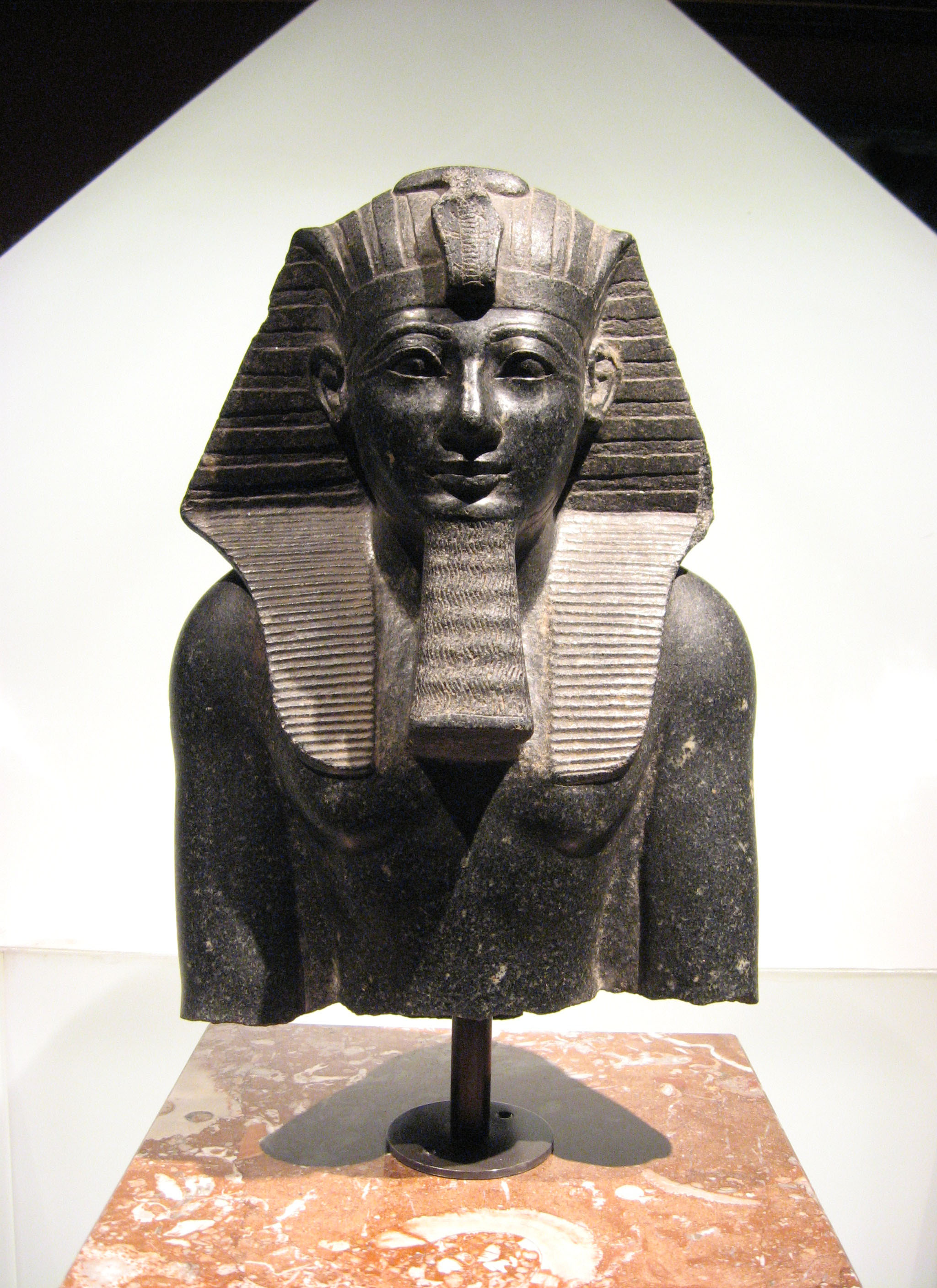
Statue of Thutmosis III, pharaoh of Egypt in the 1470s BCE

The 1470s BC was a decade lasting from January 1, 1479, BC to December 31, 1470, BC.

== Events ==
- c. 1478 BC–1390 BC—Hand mirror, Eighteenth Dynasty of Egypt, is made. It is now at the Brooklyn Museum, New York.
- c. 1473 BC—Hatshepsut (18th Dynasty) started to rule. She is a daughter of Thutmose I. Married to her half brother Thutmose II.
- c. 1473 BC–1458 BC – Funerary temple of Hatshepsut, Deir el-Bahari is built. Eighteenth Dynasty of Egypt.
- c. 1473 BC–1458 BC—Hatshepsut as sphinx, from Deir el-Bahari was made. Eighteenth Dynasty of Egypt. It is now in the Metropolitan Museum of Art, New York.

== Significant people ==
- Thutmose III, Pharaoh of the Eighteenth Dynasty (1479 BC–1425 BC). He was the first who called himself "pharaoh"
- Hatshepsut, female Pharaoh of the 18th Dynasty (1473 BC–1458 BC)
