= 1450s BC =

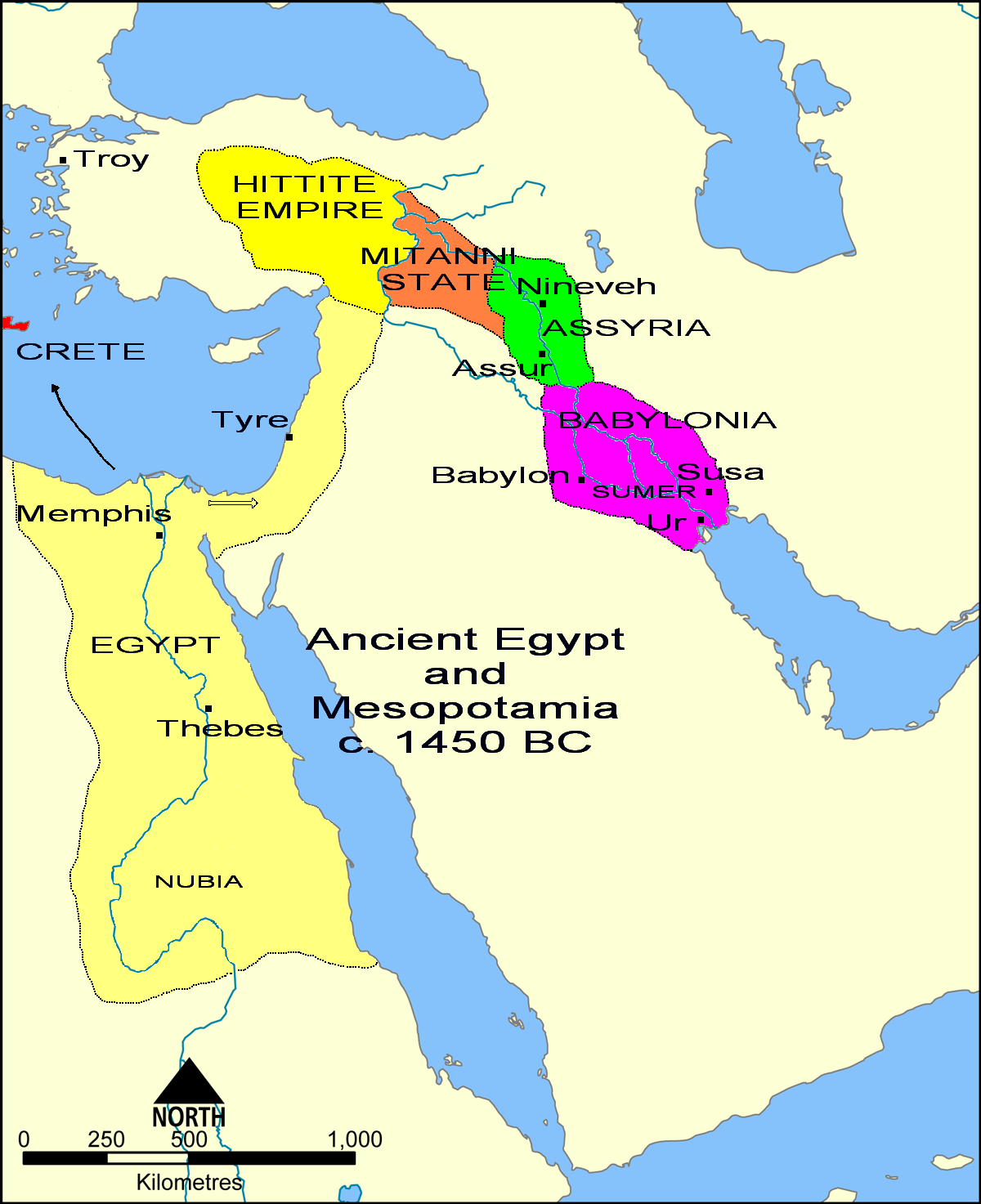
Map of the Near East in 1450 BCE.

The 1450s BC was a decade lasting from January 1, 1459, BC to December 31, 1450, BC.

== Events and trends ==
- Battle of Megiddo (15th century BC) between Thutmose III and a coalition under the King of Kadesh. It is the first battle to have been recorded in what is accepted as relatively reliable detail. The battle took place in year 23 I Shemsu day 20 (or possibly day 21). The exact year depends on the year Thutmose ascended to the throne of Egypt and among scholars the estimates range from 1479 to 1504 BCE. Using the 1479 BCE estimate the battle could have taken place in May 1457 BCE.
- 1451 BCE—According to James Ussher's chronology, this is when the Israelites entered the Promised Land.
- c. 1450 BCE—Mycenaeans attack and capture Crete, destroying many royal palaces including Knossos.
- c. 1450–1300 BCE—Minoan Second Palace period ends and Late Minoan/Final Palace culture.
