= Carene (Mysia) =

Ancient city in Aeolis

Coordinates: 39°10′44″N 26°50′32″E

Carene or Karene (Ancient Greek: Καρήνη), also known as Carine or Karine (Καρίνη), was a town of ancient Mysia. The army of Xerxes I, on the route from Sardis to the Hellespont, marched from the Caicus through the Atarneus to Carene; and from Carene through the plain of Thebe, passing by Adramyttium and Antandrus. Carene is mentioned by Stephanus of Byzantium, and also mentioned in a fragment of Ephorus as having sent some settlers to Ephesus, after the Ephesians had sustained a defeat from the people of Priene.

Its site is tentatively located near Assar Kaya/Tasağıl, Asiatic Turkey.
