= Cranaechme =

In Greek mythology, Cranaechme or Kranaichme (Ancient Greek: Κραναίχμη, romanized: Kranaichmē, lit. 'rocky point' or 'rocky spear-point') was the daughter of King Cranaus and Pedias, the Lacedaemonian daughter of Mynes. She is the sister of Cranae and Atthis.
