= Cranaë =

In Greek mythology, Cranaë (Ancient Greek: Κρανάη, romanized: Kranaē or Kranai, lit. 'rocky', 'stony' or 'hard') was an Athenian princess as daughter of King Cranaus and Pedias, the Lacedaemonian daughter of Mynes. She was the sister of Cranaechme and Atthis.
