= Lyrnessus =

Ancient Greek city

In Greek mythology, Lyrnessus (/lərˈnɛsəs/; Ancient Greek: Λυρνησσός) was a town or city in Dardania (Asia Minor), inhabited by Cilicians. It was closely associated with the nearby Cilician Thebe. At the time of the Trojan War, it was said to have been ruled by a king named Euenus. Briseis, the widow of his son Mynes, became a prize of Achilles.

== See also ==
- Ancient sites of Balıkesir
