= Briseis =

Greek mythological character

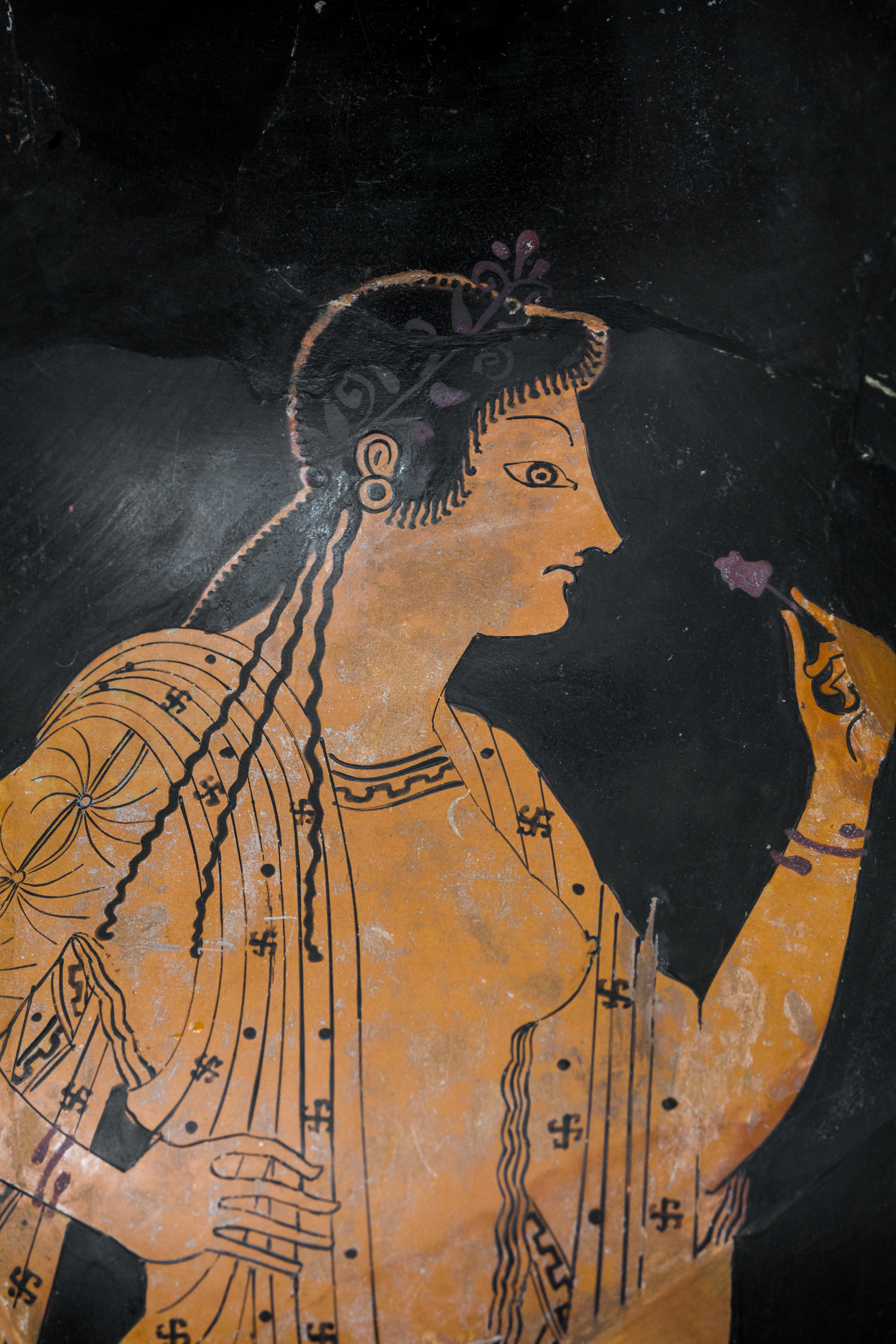
- Briseis smelling a flower, red-figure pottery, c. 520–510 BC
- Abode: Lyrnessus

Genealogy
- Parents: Briseus (father)
- Spouse: King Mynes

Briseis (/braɪˈsiːɪs/; Ancient Greek: Βρισηίς, romanized: Brīsēís, lit. 'daughter of Briseus', pronounced [briːsɛːís]), also known as Hippodameia (Ἱπποδάμεια, [hippodámeːa]), is a significant character in the Iliad. Her role as a status symbol is at the heart of the dispute between Achilles and Agamemnon that initiates the plot of Homer's epic. She was married to Mynes, a son of the King of Lyrnessus, until the Achaeans sacked her city and she was given to Achilles shortly before the events of the poem. Being forced to give Briseis to Agamemnon, Achilles refused to reenter the battle.

== Description ==
Briseis, from the House of the Tragic Poet in Pompeii, fresco, 1st century AD, now in the National Archaeological Museum, Naples

Briseis receives the same minimal physical description as most other minor characters in the Iliad. She is described with the standard metrical epithets that the poet uses to describe a great beauty, though her appearance is left entirely up to the audience's imagination. Her beauty is compared to that of the goddesses.

Briseis was imagined about two millennia later by the Byzantine poet John Tzetzes as:

tall and white, her hair was black and curly;
she had beautiful breasts and cheeks and nose; she was, also, well-behaved;
her smile was bright, her eyebrows big

In the account of Dares the Phrygian (probably the 5th century AD), Briseis was illustrated as "... beautiful. She was small and blonde, with soft yellow hair. Her eyebrows were joined above her lovely eyes. Her body was well-proportioned. She was charming, friendly, modest, ingenuous, and pious", while Malalas describes her as "... tall, fair, beautiful-breasted, well-dressed, with close-knit eyebrows, a good nose, big eyes, eyelashes with kohl, curly hair worn long in back, with a ready smile".

== Mythology ==
According to her mythology, Briseis was the daughter of Briseus and an unnamed mother. She had three full brothers who died in the sacking of Lyrnessus. Two of her brothers, according to Malalas, were named Andros and Thyas. She was married to an unnamed husband who was killed by Achilles.

In the Iliad, Achilles led the assault on Lyrnessus during the Trojan War and slew several of the men in her family. She was subsequently given to Achilles as a war prize. In the Mycenaean Greek society described in the Iliad, captive women like Briseis were slaves and could be traded amongst the warriors. John Tzetzes suggests that it was Palamedes who abducted Briseis, and from the Achaeans' collected spoils Achilles was given Briseis.

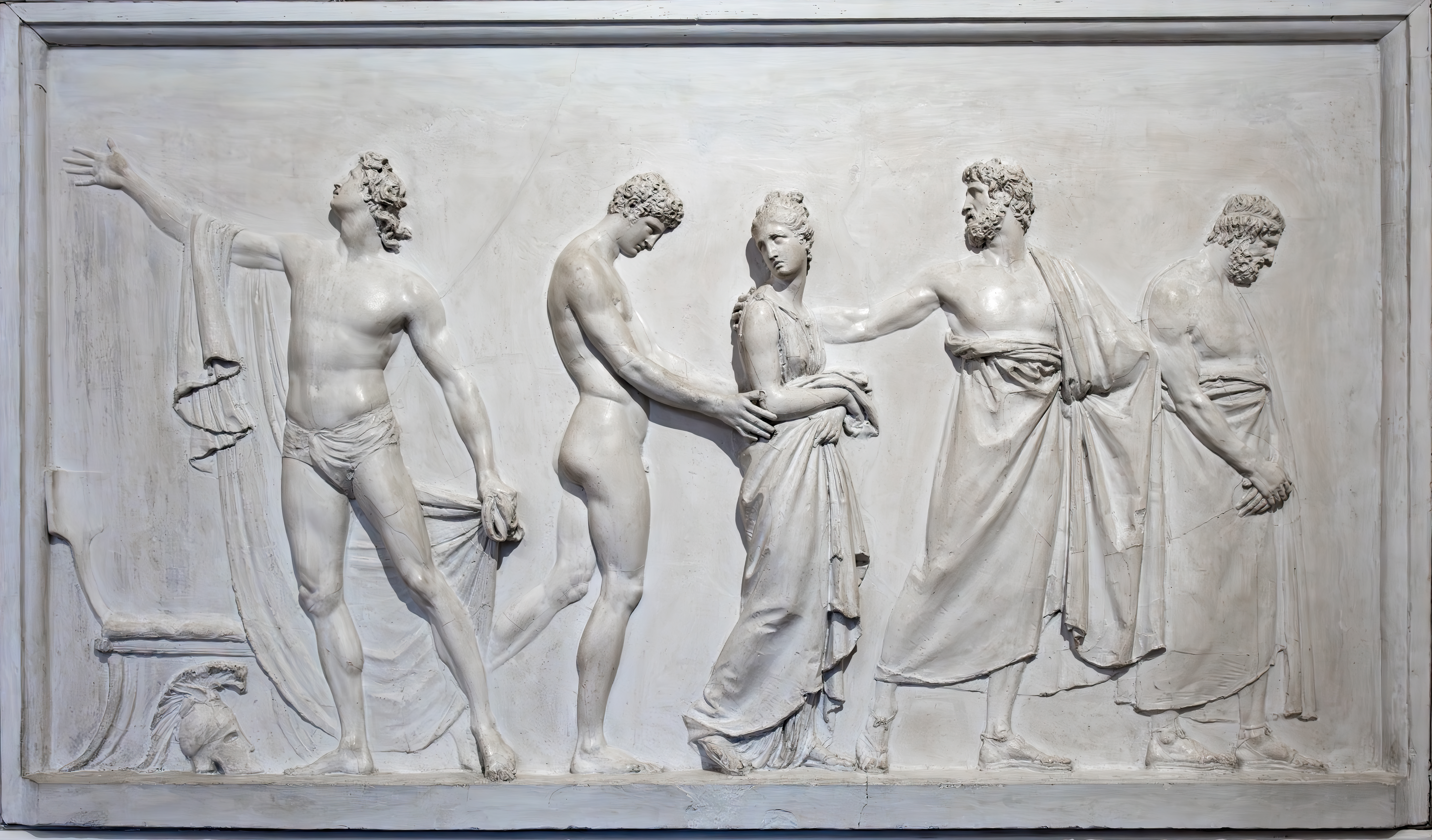
Achilles delivering Briseis to Agamemnon's heralds by Antonio Canova, circa 1790.

According to Book 1 of the Iliad, when Agamemnon was compelled by Apollo to give up his own slave, Chryseis, he demanded Briseis as compensation. This prompted a quarrel with Achilles that culminated with Briseis' delivery to Agamemnon and Achilles's protracted withdrawal from battle. His absence had disastrous consequences for the Greeks. Despite Agamemnon’s lavish offers of treasure, women, and even the return of Briseis, Achilles refused them all and did not return to the fray until the death of Patroclus.

Achilles was enraged with Agamemnon and seethed in his tent, furious that Agamemnon had dared to insult his honor and standing among the Greeks by stripping him of a prize that was awarded to him. When Achilles finally returned to battle to avenge Patroclus, Odysseus had to persuade him to accept Briseis back from Agamemnon, as Achilles no longer minded her, nor anything tied to the quarrel. Agamemnon swore that he never had sex with Briseis.

When Odysseus, Ajax, and Phoenix visit Achilles to negotiate her return in book 9, Achilles refers to Briseis as his wife or his bride. He professes to have loved her as much as any man loves his wife, at one point using Menelaus and Helen to complain about the injustice of his "wife" being taken from him. This romanticized, domestic view of their relationship contrasts with book 19, in which Briseis herself speaks. As she laments Patroclus's death, she wonders what will happen to her without his intercession on her behalf, saying that Patroclus promised her he would get Achilles to make her his legal wife instead of his slave.

In book 19 of the Iliad, Achilles makes a rousing speech to the Achaean soldiers. He publicly declares that he will ignore his anger with Agamemnon and return to battle. During his speech, Achilles says he wishes Briseis were dead, lamenting that she ever came between Agamemnon and himself. This contrasts his own statements in book 9.

She remained with Achilles until his death, which plunged her into great grief. According to later authors, she soon took it upon herself to prepare Achilles for the afterlife. According to Robert Bell, following his death, Briseis "was given to one of Achilles's comrades-at-arms just as his armour had been", after the fall of Troy. According to Malalas, she died from illness.

In medieval romances, starting with the Roman de Troie, Briseis becomes Briseida and is the daughter of Calchas. She loves and is loved by Troilus and then Diomedes. She is later confused with Chryseis and it is under variations of that name that the character is developed further, becoming Chaucer's Criseyde, then Shakespeare's Cressida.

== Portrayals in literature and art ==
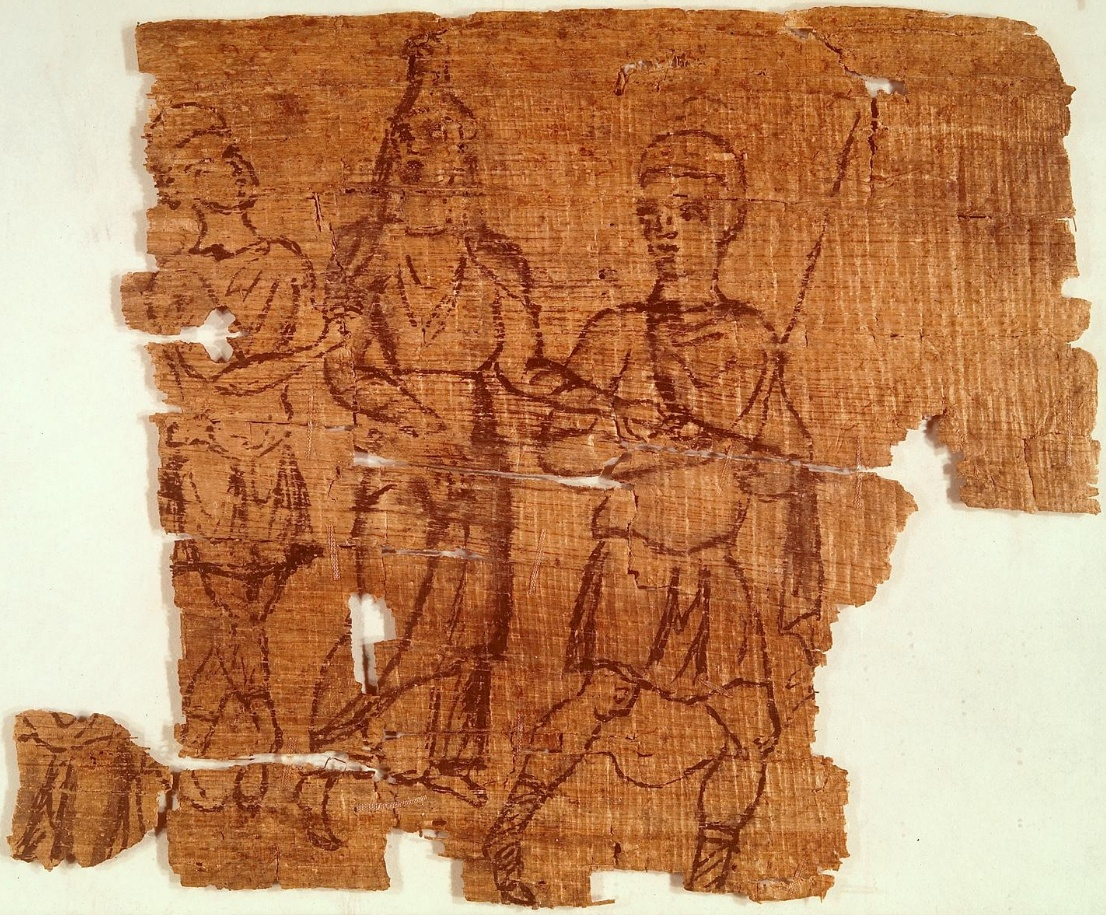
Abduction of Briseis, 4th century

- Iliad, a Greek epic poem attributed to Homer
- Heroides, a work by the Roman poet Ovid, made up of letters from mythological heroines to their heroes.
- Posthomerica, a Greek epic poem by Quintus of Smyrna; Briseis appears in Book 3 mourning the death of Achilles
- Abduction of Briseis, a papyrus drawing, possibly of Ancient Egyptian origin, depicting Briseis being abducted by Agamemnon's heralds, Talthybius and Eurybates
- 'The Silence of the Girls' (2018) retells the Iliad from the point of view of Briseis, and focuses on her life with Achilles.
