= Battle of Megiddo (15th century BC) =

Battle between Egypt and Canaanite rebels

- Part of Thutmose III's first campaign in the Levant
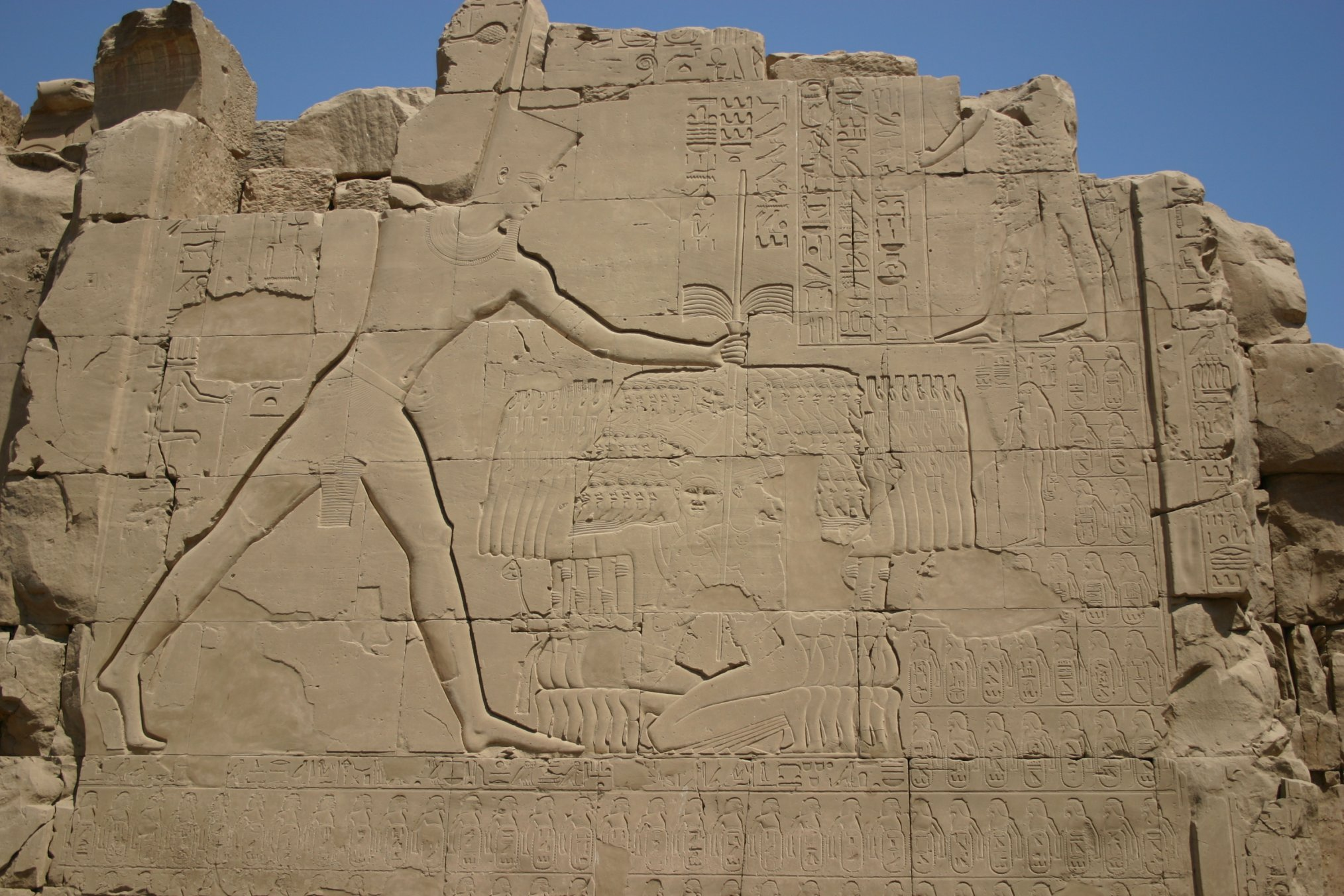
- Thutmose III smiting his enemies. Relief on the seventh pylon in Karnak
Date	April 16, 1457 BC
Location	Megiddo, Canaan 32°35′07″N 35°11′04″E
Result	Egyptian victory; Territorial expansion of the Egyptian Empire

Belligerents
Egyptian Empire	Canaanites; Kadesh; Megiddo; Kingdom of Mitanni; Hurrians

Commanders and leaders
Thutmose III	King of Kadesh; Prince of Megiddo

Strength
Unknown; modern estimates: c. 10,800	Unknown; modern estimates: c. 10,700

Casualties and losses
4,000 killed; 1,000 wounded	8,300 killed; 3,400 captured
- Location within Israel

The Battle of Megiddo (fought 15th century BC) was fought between Egyptian forces under the command of Pharaoh Thutmose III and a large rebellious coalition of Canaanite vassal states led by the king of Kadesh. It is the first battle to have been recorded in what is accepted as relatively reliable detail. Megiddo is also the first recorded use of the composite bow and the first body count. All details of the battle come from Egyptian sources—primarily the hieroglyphic writings on the Hall of Annals in the Temple of Amun-Re at Karnak, Thebes (now Luxor), by the military scribe Tjaneni.

The Ancient Egyptian account gives the date of the battle as the 21st day of the first month of the third season, of Year 23 of the reign of Thutmose III. It has been claimed that this was April 16, 1457 BC although other publications place the battle in 1482 BC or 1479 BC. The Egyptians routed the Canaanite forces, which fled to safety in the city of Megiddo. Their action resulted in the lengthy siege of Megiddo.

By reestablishing Egyptian dominance in the Levant, Thutmose III began a reign in which the Egyptian Empire reached its greatest expanse.

== Annals of Thutmose III ==
During Thutmose III's first campaign in the Levant, his personal scribe, Tjaneni, kept a daily journal on parchment. In approximately his 42nd regnal year, many years after his campaigns in the Levant had ended, Thutmose III instructed his artisans to inscribe his military exploits into the walls of Amun-Re's temple at Karnak. The annals describe in lavish detail 14 campaigns led by Thutmose III in the Levant, the booty gained through his campaigning, tribute received from conquered regions, and, lastly, offerings to Amun-Re. The sequence of depictions indicate the New Kingdom's belief on the interactions of the gods with warfare: praise and offerings to the deities in exchange for their divine help in war.

Additionally, the annals show the long-lasting effects of the battle of Megiddo. After Thutmose III's victory at Megiddo and his successful campaigns in the Levant over the next 20 years, Egypt's rise to power in the international community and its evolution into an empire is evident in the annals. Depictions show international diplomacy through the giving of gifts from Babylon, the Hittite Empire, and other prominent and powerful regions during this time period.

== Campaign against the kingdoms of Canaan ==
Pharaoh Thutmose III began a reign in which the Egyptian Empire reached its greatest expanse by reinforcing the long-standing Egyptian presence in the Levant. After waiting impatiently for the end of his regency by the Egyptian Pharaoh Hatshepsut, he immediately responded to a revolt of local rulers near Kadesh in the vicinity of modern-day Syria. As Egyptian buffer provinces in the land of the Amurru along the border with the Hittites attempted to change their vassalage, Thutmose III dealt with the threat personally. The Canaanites are thought to have been allied with the Mitanni and Amurru from the region of the two rivers between the headwaters of the Orontes and the Jordan. The driving and main force behind this revolt was the King of Kadesh. The powerful fortress of Kadesh offered protection to him and the city. The King of Megiddo, with an equally strong fortress, joined the alliance. The importance of Megiddo was its geographical location along the southwestern edge of the Jezreel Valley just beyond the Mount Carmel ridge and the Mediterranean. From this location, Megiddo controlled the Via Maris, the main trade route between Egypt and Mesopotamia.

The Egyptian inscriptions of the campaign on the Temple of Karnak come from a daily journal kept by the scribe Tjaneni during the campaign. In the Egyptian account Thutmose gathered an army of chariots and infantry numbering between ten and twenty thousand men. As the Egyptians mustered their forces, the king of Kadesh gathered many tribal chieftains from Syria, Aram and Canaan around him, estimated at between ten and fifteen thousand men, entered Megiddo and set his forces at the waters of Taanach. He expected that the Egyptians would come by way of Taanach via Dothaim, the main route from the Mediterranean lowlands into the Valley of Kishon, and from Egypt to Mesopotamia. The Egyptian army assembled at the border fortress of Tjaru (called Sele in Greek) and arrived ten days later at the loyal city of Gaza. After one day's rest, it marched north for eleven days to the city of Yehem (now Khirbet Yemmeh, south of Jatt). Here, Thutmose sent out scouts. To continue northeast from Yehem, the army had to pass the Carmel mountain range, beyond which lay the Jezreel Valley and the city and fortress of Megiddo, where the rebel forces had gathered. There were three possible routes from Yehem to Megiddo. Both the northern route, via Zefti and Yokneam, and the southern route, by way of Taanach, were safer but longer routes. The central route, via Aruna (modern Wadi Ara), was more direct but risky; it followed a narrow ravine, and the troops could only travel single-file. If the enemy waited at the end of the ravine, the Egyptians would risk being cut down piecemeal. The army leaders pleaded with him not to take the difficult road but to take either of the safer routes. Instead, with information from the scouts, Thutmose III decided to take the direct path to Megiddo. He believed that if his generals advised him to take the easier routes, then his enemy would assume he would do so, so he decided to do the unexpected.

The King of Kadesh had left large infantry detachments guarding the two more likely paths, and virtually ignored the Aruna route. Ignoring the danger of spreading out his army in the mountains where leading elements might be subject to enemy ambush in narrow mountain passes, and his main force still far behind in Aruna, unable to come to their aid, Thutmose took the direct route through Aruna (Wadi Ara). To reduce the risk, Thutmose himself led his men through Aruna. His light infantry and the mounted bowmen known as haibrw moved in quickly to eliminate any rebel pickets, leaving the main force of chariots to follow. With the city lightly guarded by the enemy, Thutmose led a quick assault, scattered the rebels and entered the valley unopposed. Now, the Egyptian army had a clear path to Megiddo, with the main forces of the rebel army far away to the northwest and southeast.

== Battle and siege ==
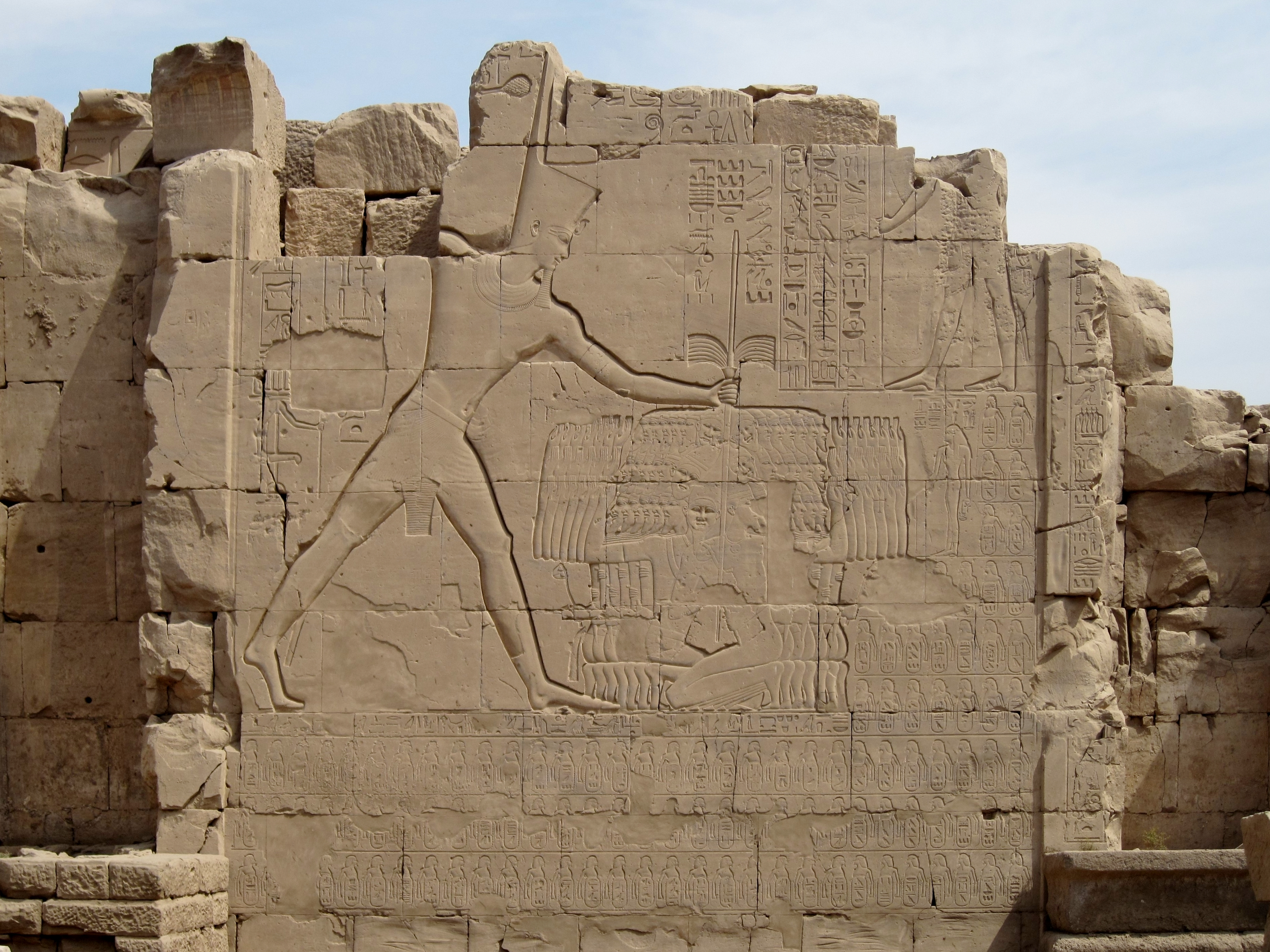
Relief in the Karnak Temple showing Thutmose III slaying Canaanite captives from the Battle of Megiddo, 15th century BC

Thutmose seized the opportunity. He set up camp at the end of the day, but during the night arrayed his forces close to the enemy; the next morning, they attacked. It cannot be established if the surprised King of Kadesh had managed to fully prepare for battle. Even if he did, it did not do him much good. Though his forces were on high ground adjacent to the fortress, the Egyptian line was arranged in a concave formation, consisting of three wings, that threatened both Canaanite flanks. Both the Egyptians and the Canaanites are estimated to have had around 1,000 chariots and 10,000 infantry. The Pharaoh led the attack from the center. The combination of position and numbers, superior maneuverability of their left wing along with an early, bold attack, broke the enemy's will; their line immediately collapsed. Those near the city fled into it, closing the gates behind them.

The Egyptian soldiers fell to plundering the enemy camp. During the plunder they captured 924 chariots and 200 suits of armor. Unfortunately for the Egyptians, during this confusion, the scattered Canaanite forces, including the kings of Kadesh and Megiddo, were able to rejoin the defenders inside the city. Those inside lowered tied-together clothing to the men and chariots and pulled them up over the walls. Thus, the opportunity of a quick capture of the city following the battle was lost.

The city was besieged for seven months and the King of Kadesh escaped. Thutmose built a moat and a wooden palisade, eventually forcing its occupants to surrender. At Karnak it is recorded that the victorious army took home 340 prisoners, 2,041 mares, 191 foals, six stallions, 924 chariots, 200 suits of armor, 502 bows, 1,929 cattle, 22,500 sheep, and the royal armor, chariot and tent-poles of the King of Megiddo. The city and citizens were spared. A number of other cities in the Jezreel Valley were conquered and Egyptian authority in the area was restored.

== Results ==
Egypt's realm was expanded by this campaign. As Paul K. Davis wrote, "By reestablishing Egyptian dominance in Canaan, Thutmose began a reign in which Egypt reached its greatest expanse as an empire." Thutmose III required from the defeated kings that they each send a son to the Egyptian court. There, they received an Egyptian education. When they returned to their homelands, they governed with Egyptian sympathies. Nevertheless, the victory at Megiddo was only the beginning of the pacification of the Levant. Only after several further campaigns, conducted almost annually, was the unrest cooled. One unanticipated result came in the form of the word Armageddon, which took its root from Megiddo's name.

== Archaeology ==
Excavations carried out in the Jezreel Valley, in the north of Israel, have revealed the presence of pottery dating back to the 7th century BC, indicating that an Egyptian garrison was stationed there.

== General references ==
- Cline, Eric H. (May 2002) [2000]. The Battles of Armageddon: Megiddo and the Jezreel Valley from the Bronze Age to the Nuclear Age. University of Michigan Press. ISBN 978-0-472-06739-8.
- Cline, Eric H., and O'Connor, David (2006). "Thutmose III: A New Biography". University of Michigan Press. ISBN 0-472-11467-0
- Dupuy, Trevor Nesbit (1990). The Evolution of Weapons and Warfare. DaCapo. ISBN 0-306-80384-4.
- Dupuy, Richard Ernest, and Dupuy, Trevor Nesbit (1993). The Encyclopedia of Military History from 3500 B.C. to the Present. HarperCollins. ISBN 0-06-270056-1
- Redford, Donald B. (2003). The Wars in Syria and Palestine of Thutmose III. Culture and History of the Ancient Near East. Brill. ISBN 978-90-04-12989-4.
