= Atthis (mythology) =

In Greek mythology, Atthis (Ancient Greek: Ἀτθίς, lit. 'from Attica', 'Attic woman' or 'pertaining to the coast/ shore') or Attis (Ancient Greek: Ἄττις) was the eponymous heroine of Attica.

== Family ==
Atthis was an Athenian princess as the daughter of the autochthonous King Cranaus and Pedias, the Lacedaemonian daughter of Mynes. She was the sister of Cranaë and Cranaechme.

== Mythology ==
When Attis died a virgin, her father Cranaus named in her honour the land Attica which was formerly called Actaea (Acte or Actica) after King Actaeus, its former ruler.

Apollodorus also mentions that by Hephaestus, Attis had Erichthonius, although he also mentions that it might have been by Gaia or Athena instead.

== Other use ==
The two birds into which Philomele and her sister Procne were metamorphosed, were likewise called Attis.
