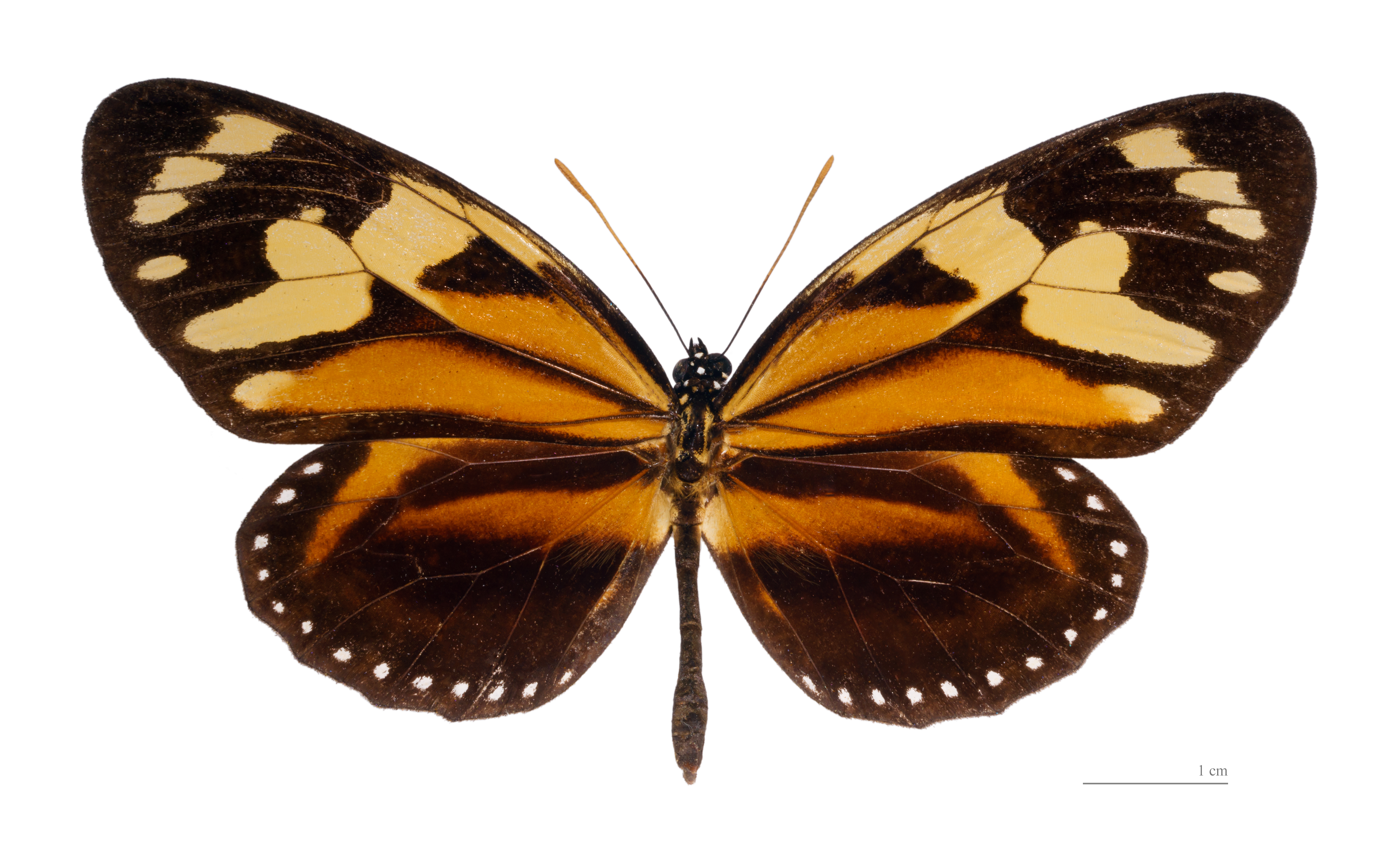
- Lycorea halia - MHNT

Scientific classification
- Domain: Eukaryota
- Kingdom: Animalia
- Phylum: Arthropoda
- Class: Insecta
- Order: Lepidoptera
- Family: Nymphalidae
- Subtribe: Euploeina
- Genus: Lycorea; Doubleday, [1847]

Species
- See text

= Lycorea =

Genus of brush-footed butterflies

Lycorea is a genus of butterflies from the family Nymphalidae found in Mexico, Central America, and South America.

== Species ==
Listed alphabetically.

- Lycorea halia (Hübner, 1816) – tropical milkweed butterfly
- Lycorea ilione (Cramer, [1775]) – clearwing mimic queen
- Lycorea pasinuntia (Stoll, [1780]) – pasinuntia mimic queen
