= Cranaus =

Second King of Athens in Greek mythology

In Greek mythology, Cranaus or Kranaos (/ˈkræni.əs/; Ancient Greek: Κραναός, romanized: Kranaós, lit. 'stony' or 'rugged') was the second King of Athens, succeeding Cecrops I.

== Family ==
Cranaus married Pedias, a Spartan woman and daughter of Mynes, with whom he had three daughters: Cranaë, Cranaechme, and Atthis. Atthis gave her name to Attica after dying, possibly as a young girl, although in other traditions she was the mother, by Hephaestus, of Erichthonius. Rarus was also given as a son of Cranaus.

== Reign ==
Cranaus was supposed to have reigned for 9 years and was an autochthon (born from the earth), like his predecessor. During his reign, the flood of the Deucalion story was thought to have occurred. In some accounts, Deucalion was said to have fled Lycorea to Athens with his sons Hellen and Amphictyon. Deucalion died shortly thereafter and was said to have been buried near Athens. Amphictyon is said to have married one of the daughters of Cranaus.

Cranaus was deposed by Amphictyon son of Deucalion, who was himself later deposed by Erichthonius. Cranaus fled to Lamptrae, where he died and was buried. His tomb was still there in the times of Pausanias. Cranaus was venerated as hero in Athens; his priests came from the family Charidae.

The people of Attica were referred to as Kranaoi after Cranaus, and Athens as Kranaa or Kranaai.

Regnal titles
Preceded by Cecrops I	King of Athens; 9 years	Succeeded by Amphictyon
